

100001–100100 

|-bgcolor=#d6d6d6
| 100001 ||  || — || October 20, 1982 || Kitt Peak || G. Aldering || — || align=right | 4.4 km || 
|-id=002 bgcolor=#fefefe
| 100002 ||  || — || August 30, 1983 || Palomar || J. Gibson || NYS || align=right | 1.2 km || 
|-id=003 bgcolor=#fefefe
| 100003 ||  || — || September 1, 1983 || La Silla || H. Debehogne || — || align=right | 3.3 km || 
|-id=004 bgcolor=#FFC2E0
| 100004 || 1983 VA || — || November 1, 1983 || IRAS || IRAS || APO +1km || align=right | 2.7 km || 
|-id=005 bgcolor=#fefefe
| 100005 || 1986 RY || — || September 6, 1986 || Palomar || E. F. Helin || — || align=right | 1.6 km || 
|-id=006 bgcolor=#FA8072
| 100006 ||  || — || February 28, 1987 || La Silla || H. Debehogne || — || align=right | 2.0 km || 
|-id=007 bgcolor=#d6d6d6
| 100007 Peters ||  ||  || February 13, 1988 || La Silla || E. W. Elst || ALA || align=right | 7.5 km || 
|-id=008 bgcolor=#FA8072
| 100008 || 1988 QZ || — || August 16, 1988 || Palomar || C. S. Shoemaker || — || align=right | 2.3 km || 
|-id=009 bgcolor=#fefefe
| 100009 ||  || — || September 1, 1988 || La Silla || H. Debehogne || — || align=right | 1.5 km || 
|-id=010 bgcolor=#E9E9E9
| 100010 ||  || — || September 14, 1988 || Cerro Tololo || S. J. Bus || — || align=right | 8.1 km || 
|-id=011 bgcolor=#E9E9E9
| 100011 ||  || — || November 11, 1988 || Kushiro || S. Ueda, H. Kaneda || — || align=right | 5.6 km || 
|-id=012 bgcolor=#E9E9E9
| 100012 ||  || — || January 25, 1989 || Kleť || A. Mrkos || — || align=right | 6.2 km || 
|-id=013 bgcolor=#E9E9E9
| 100013 ||  || — || February 4, 1989 || La Silla || E. W. Elst || — || align=right | 5.3 km || 
|-id=014 bgcolor=#E9E9E9
| 100014 ||  || — || September 26, 1989 || La Silla || E. W. Elst || — || align=right | 2.5 km || 
|-id=015 bgcolor=#FA8072
| 100015 ||  || — || September 28, 1989 || Palomar || C. S. Shoemaker || moon || align=right | 2.0 km || 
|-id=016 bgcolor=#E9E9E9
| 100016 ||  || — || September 28, 1989 || Palomar || C. S. Shoemaker || — || align=right | 2.3 km || 
|-id=017 bgcolor=#FA8072
| 100017 ||  || — || October 3, 1989 || Cerro Tololo || S. J. Bus || — || align=right | 1.4 km || 
|-id=018 bgcolor=#fefefe
| 100018 ||  || — || October 7, 1989 || La Silla || E. W. Elst || NYS || align=right | 1.3 km || 
|-id=019 bgcolor=#E9E9E9
| 100019 Gregorianik ||  ||  || October 23, 1989 || Tautenburg Observatory || F. Börngen || — || align=right | 2.2 km || 
|-id=020 bgcolor=#fefefe
| 100020 ||  || — || August 23, 1990 || Palomar || H. E. Holt || FLO || align=right | 3.6 km || 
|-id=021 bgcolor=#fefefe
| 100021 ||  || — || August 16, 1990 || La Silla || E. W. Elst || MAS || align=right | 2.1 km || 
|-id=022 bgcolor=#fefefe
| 100022 ||  || — || September 22, 1990 || La Silla || E. W. Elst || — || align=right | 1.5 km || 
|-id=023 bgcolor=#E9E9E9
| 100023 ||  || — || September 22, 1990 || La Silla || E. W. Elst || — || align=right | 2.0 km || 
|-id=024 bgcolor=#E9E9E9
| 100024 ||  || — || September 22, 1990 || La Silla || E. W. Elst || — || align=right | 2.2 km || 
|-id=025 bgcolor=#fefefe
| 100025 ||  || — || September 22, 1990 || La Silla || E. W. Elst || V || align=right | 1.8 km || 
|-id=026 bgcolor=#fefefe
| 100026 ||  || — || September 22, 1990 || La Silla || E. W. Elst || NYS || align=right | 1.8 km || 
|-id=027 bgcolor=#fefefe
| 100027 Hannaharendt ||  ||  || October 12, 1990 || Tautenburg Observatory || F. Börngen, L. D. Schmadel || NYS || align=right | 1.4 km || 
|-id=028 bgcolor=#d6d6d6
| 100028 von Canstein ||  ||  || October 10, 1990 || Tautenburg Observatory || F. Börngen, L. D. Schmadel || — || align=right | 6.2 km || 
|-id=029 bgcolor=#d6d6d6
| 100029 Varnhagen ||  ||  || October 10, 1990 || Tautenburg Observatory || F. Börngen, L. D. Schmadel || — || align=right | 5.6 km || 
|-id=030 bgcolor=#d6d6d6
| 100030 ||  || — || November 18, 1990 || La Silla || E. W. Elst || — || align=right | 4.2 km || 
|-id=031 bgcolor=#d6d6d6
| 100031 ||  || — || March 20, 1991 || La Silla || H. Debehogne || — || align=right | 5.5 km || 
|-id=032 bgcolor=#E9E9E9
| 100032 ||  || — || April 8, 1991 || La Silla || E. W. Elst || — || align=right | 2.9 km || 
|-id=033 bgcolor=#d6d6d6
| 100033 Taizé ||  ||  || April 9, 1991 || Tautenburg Observatory || F. Börngen || — || align=right | 7.1 km || 
|-id=034 bgcolor=#fefefe
| 100034 ||  || — || August 2, 1991 || La Silla || E. W. Elst || — || align=right | 4.0 km || 
|-id=035 bgcolor=#E9E9E9
| 100035 ||  || — || August 5, 1991 || Palomar || H. E. Holt || — || align=right | 6.5 km || 
|-id=036 bgcolor=#fefefe
| 100036 ||  || — || August 6, 1991 || Palomar || H. E. Holt || NYS || align=right | 1.3 km || 
|-id=037 bgcolor=#fefefe
| 100037 || 1991 RM || — || September 4, 1991 || Palomar || E. F. Helin || CHL || align=right | 5.4 km || 
|-id=038 bgcolor=#E9E9E9
| 100038 ||  || — || September 13, 1991 || Palomar || H. E. Holt || — || align=right | 3.0 km || 
|-id=039 bgcolor=#fefefe
| 100039 ||  || — || September 15, 1991 || Palomar || H. E. Holt || NYS || align=right | 1.6 km || 
|-id=040 bgcolor=#d6d6d6
| 100040 ||  || — || September 11, 1991 || Palomar || H. E. Holt || Tj (2.98) || align=right | 9.4 km || 
|-id=041 bgcolor=#E9E9E9
| 100041 ||  || — || September 8, 1991 || Kitt Peak || Spacewatch || — || align=right | 4.1 km || 
|-id=042 bgcolor=#fefefe
| 100042 ||  || — || September 16, 1991 || Palomar || H. E. Holt || — || align=right | 2.4 km || 
|-id=043 bgcolor=#d6d6d6
| 100043 ||  || — || September 29, 1991 || Kitt Peak || Spacewatch || — || align=right | 4.7 km || 
|-id=044 bgcolor=#fefefe
| 100044 || 1991 TX || — || October 1, 1991 || Siding Spring || R. H. McNaught || — || align=right | 2.6 km || 
|-id=045 bgcolor=#FA8072
| 100045 ||  || — || October 5, 1991 || Palomar || C. S. Shoemaker || PHO || align=right | 3.9 km || 
|-id=046 bgcolor=#E9E9E9
| 100046 Worms ||  ||  || October 2, 1991 || Tautenburg Observatory || F. Börngen, L. D. Schmadel || — || align=right | 3.3 km || 
|-id=047 bgcolor=#fefefe
| 100047 Leobaeck ||  ||  || October 2, 1991 || Tautenburg Observatory || F. Börngen, L. D. Schmadel || NYS || align=right | 1.8 km || 
|-id=048 bgcolor=#d6d6d6
| 100048 ||  || — || October 2, 1991 || Palomar || C. P. de Saint-Aignan || EUP || align=right | 9.3 km || 
|-id=049 bgcolor=#fefefe
| 100049 Césarann ||  ||  || October 6, 1991 || Palomar || A. Lowe || NYS || align=right data-sort-value="0.98" | 980 m || 
|-id=050 bgcolor=#E9E9E9
| 100050 Carloshernandez ||  ||  || October 6, 1991 || Palomar || A. Lowe || — || align=right | 2.0 km || 
|-id=051 bgcolor=#fefefe
| 100051 Davidhernandez ||  ||  || October 6, 1991 || Palomar || A. Lowe || — || align=right | 1.4 km || 
|-id=052 bgcolor=#E9E9E9
| 100052 ||  || — || November 7, 1991 || Palomar || C. S. Shoemaker || — || align=right | 6.5 km || 
|-id=053 bgcolor=#fefefe
| 100053 Danstinebring ||  ||  || January 2, 1992 || Kitt Peak || Spacewatch || MAS || align=right | 1.6 km || 
|-id=054 bgcolor=#fefefe
| 100054 ||  || — || January 29, 1992 || Kitt Peak || Spacewatch || FLO || align=right | 1.1 km || 
|-id=055 bgcolor=#E9E9E9
| 100055 ||  || — || January 29, 1992 || Kitt Peak || Spacewatch || — || align=right | 2.4 km || 
|-id=056 bgcolor=#E9E9E9
| 100056 ||  || — || February 29, 1992 || Kitt Peak || Spacewatch || — || align=right | 3.1 km || 
|-id=057 bgcolor=#E9E9E9
| 100057 ||  || — || February 29, 1992 || La Silla || UESAC || EUN || align=right | 3.0 km || 
|-id=058 bgcolor=#fefefe
| 100058 || 1992 EH || — || March 5, 1992 || Kitt Peak || Spacewatch || H || align=right | 1.2 km || 
|-id=059 bgcolor=#E9E9E9
| 100059 ||  || — || March 1, 1992 || La Silla || UESAC || RAF || align=right | 2.0 km || 
|-id=060 bgcolor=#E9E9E9
| 100060 ||  || — || March 1, 1992 || La Silla || UESAC || JUN || align=right | 1.8 km || 
|-id=061 bgcolor=#d6d6d6
| 100061 ||  || — || March 1, 1992 || La Silla || UESAC || — || align=right | 4.7 km || 
|-id=062 bgcolor=#E9E9E9
| 100062 ||  || — || March 2, 1992 || La Silla || UESAC || — || align=right | 2.4 km || 
|-id=063 bgcolor=#E9E9E9
| 100063 ||  || — || March 2, 1992 || La Silla || UESAC || MAR || align=right | 2.4 km || 
|-id=064 bgcolor=#E9E9E9
| 100064 ||  || — || March 1, 1992 || La Silla || UESAC || — || align=right | 1.9 km || 
|-id=065 bgcolor=#d6d6d6
| 100065 ||  || — || March 8, 1992 || La Silla || UESAC || — || align=right | 4.4 km || 
|-id=066 bgcolor=#E9E9E9
| 100066 ||  || — || March 8, 1992 || La Silla || UESAC || JUN || align=right | 2.0 km || 
|-id=067 bgcolor=#E9E9E9
| 100067 ||  || — || March 2, 1992 || La Silla || UESAC || — || align=right | 3.2 km || 
|-id=068 bgcolor=#E9E9E9
| 100068 ||  || — || March 8, 1992 || La Silla || UESAC || — || align=right | 2.7 km || 
|-id=069 bgcolor=#E9E9E9
| 100069 ||  || — || March 2, 1992 || La Silla || UESAC || — || align=right | 3.0 km || 
|-id=070 bgcolor=#fefefe
| 100070 ||  || — || March 3, 1992 || La Silla || UESAC || — || align=right | 1.7 km || 
|-id=071 bgcolor=#E9E9E9
| 100071 ||  || — || March 1, 1992 || La Silla || UESAC || — || align=right | 2.0 km || 
|-id=072 bgcolor=#E9E9E9
| 100072 ||  || — || March 1, 1992 || La Silla || UESAC || — || align=right | 2.0 km || 
|-id=073 bgcolor=#E9E9E9
| 100073 ||  || — || March 1, 1992 || La Silla || UESAC || BAR || align=right | 2.3 km || 
|-id=074 bgcolor=#E9E9E9
| 100074 ||  || — || July 26, 1992 || La Silla || E. W. Elst || — || align=right | 2.7 km || 
|-id=075 bgcolor=#E9E9E9
| 100075 ||  || — || August 8, 1992 || Caussols || E. W. Elst || — || align=right | 5.1 km || 
|-id=076 bgcolor=#fefefe
| 100076 ||  || — || August 8, 1992 || Caussols || E. W. Elst || — || align=right | 1.5 km || 
|-id=077 bgcolor=#E9E9E9
| 100077 Tertzakian ||  ||  || August 7, 1992 || Palomar || A. Lowe || — || align=right | 3.7 km || 
|-id=078 bgcolor=#E9E9E9
| 100078 ||  || — || September 2, 1992 || La Silla || E. W. Elst || GER || align=right | 3.3 km || 
|-id=079 bgcolor=#E9E9E9
| 100079 ||  || — || September 2, 1992 || La Silla || E. W. Elst || — || align=right | 3.3 km || 
|-id=080 bgcolor=#E9E9E9
| 100080 ||  || — || September 2, 1992 || La Silla || E. W. Elst || DOR || align=right | 6.0 km || 
|-id=081 bgcolor=#d6d6d6
| 100081 ||  || — || September 27, 1992 || Kitt Peak || Spacewatch || — || align=right | 3.9 km || 
|-id=082 bgcolor=#d6d6d6
| 100082 ||  || — || September 27, 1992 || Kitt Peak || Spacewatch || — || align=right | 3.7 km || 
|-id=083 bgcolor=#E9E9E9
| 100083 ||  || — || September 30, 1992 || Kitami || K. Endate, K. Watanabe || — || align=right | 5.3 km || 
|-id=084 bgcolor=#fefefe
| 100084 ||  || — || September 26, 1992 || Tautenburg Observatory || F. Börngen, L. D. Schmadel || — || align=right | 3.4 km || 
|-id=085 bgcolor=#FFC2E0
| 100085 ||  || — || October 25, 1992 || Palomar || C. S. Shoemaker || APO +1kmPHA || align=right data-sort-value="0.98" | 980 m || 
|-id=086 bgcolor=#fefefe
| 100086 ||  || — || October 18, 1992 || Kitt Peak || Spacewatch || — || align=right | 1.3 km || 
|-id=087 bgcolor=#d6d6d6
| 100087 ||  || — || January 22, 1993 || Kitt Peak || Spacewatch || — || align=right | 5.2 km || 
|-id=088 bgcolor=#FA8072
| 100088 || 1993 DC || — || February 18, 1993 || Kitt Peak || Spacewatch || — || align=right | 1.8 km || 
|-id=089 bgcolor=#d6d6d6
| 100089 ||  || — || March 23, 1993 || Kitt Peak || Spacewatch || — || align=right | 5.7 km || 
|-id=090 bgcolor=#d6d6d6
| 100090 ||  || — || March 17, 1993 || La Silla || UESAC || THM || align=right | 4.6 km || 
|-id=091 bgcolor=#E9E9E9
| 100091 ||  || — || March 17, 1993 || La Silla || UESAC || — || align=right | 2.2 km || 
|-id=092 bgcolor=#E9E9E9
| 100092 ||  || — || March 17, 1993 || La Silla || UESAC || — || align=right | 1.6 km || 
|-id=093 bgcolor=#E9E9E9
| 100093 ||  || — || March 17, 1993 || La Silla || UESAC || — || align=right | 2.3 km || 
|-id=094 bgcolor=#d6d6d6
| 100094 ||  || — || March 17, 1993 || La Silla || UESAC || EOS || align=right | 5.8 km || 
|-id=095 bgcolor=#fefefe
| 100095 ||  || — || March 17, 1993 || La Silla || UESAC || V || align=right | 1.4 km || 
|-id=096 bgcolor=#fefefe
| 100096 ||  || — || March 17, 1993 || La Silla || UESAC || V || align=right | 1.3 km || 
|-id=097 bgcolor=#E9E9E9
| 100097 ||  || — || March 17, 1993 || La Silla || UESAC || WIT || align=right | 2.3 km || 
|-id=098 bgcolor=#d6d6d6
| 100098 ||  || — || March 17, 1993 || La Silla || UESAC || EOS || align=right | 4.3 km || 
|-id=099 bgcolor=#d6d6d6
| 100099 ||  || — || March 21, 1993 || La Silla || UESAC || — || align=right | 4.8 km || 
|-id=100 bgcolor=#d6d6d6
| 100100 ||  || — || March 21, 1993 || La Silla || UESAC || 7:4 || align=right | 5.0 km || 
|}

100101–100200 

|-bgcolor=#E9E9E9
| 100101 ||  || — || March 21, 1993 || La Silla || UESAC || — || align=right | 1.6 km || 
|-id=102 bgcolor=#fefefe
| 100102 ||  || — || March 19, 1993 || La Silla || UESAC || — || align=right | 1.8 km || 
|-id=103 bgcolor=#fefefe
| 100103 ||  || — || March 19, 1993 || La Silla || UESAC || NYS || align=right | 1.1 km || 
|-id=104 bgcolor=#fefefe
| 100104 ||  || — || March 19, 1993 || La Silla || UESAC || NYS || align=right | 1.2 km || 
|-id=105 bgcolor=#d6d6d6
| 100105 ||  || — || March 19, 1993 || La Silla || UESAC || — || align=right | 5.0 km || 
|-id=106 bgcolor=#d6d6d6
| 100106 ||  || — || March 19, 1993 || La Silla || UESAC || EOS || align=right | 3.4 km || 
|-id=107 bgcolor=#d6d6d6
| 100107 ||  || — || March 19, 1993 || La Silla || UESAC || KOR || align=right | 2.9 km || 
|-id=108 bgcolor=#fefefe
| 100108 ||  || — || March 19, 1993 || La Silla || UESAC || NYS || align=right | 1.1 km || 
|-id=109 bgcolor=#d6d6d6
| 100109 ||  || — || March 19, 1993 || La Silla || UESAC || — || align=right | 5.0 km || 
|-id=110 bgcolor=#fefefe
| 100110 ||  || — || March 19, 1993 || La Silla || UESAC || EUT || align=right | 1.1 km || 
|-id=111 bgcolor=#d6d6d6
| 100111 ||  || — || March 19, 1993 || La Silla || UESAC || — || align=right | 6.1 km || 
|-id=112 bgcolor=#E9E9E9
| 100112 ||  || — || March 17, 1993 || La Silla || UESAC || — || align=right | 1.7 km || 
|-id=113 bgcolor=#fefefe
| 100113 ||  || — || March 21, 1993 || La Silla || UESAC || — || align=right | 1.9 km || 
|-id=114 bgcolor=#d6d6d6
| 100114 ||  || — || March 19, 1993 || La Silla || UESAC || 7:4 || align=right | 7.6 km || 
|-id=115 bgcolor=#fefefe
| 100115 ||  || — || April 19, 1993 || Kitt Peak || Spacewatch || — || align=right | 2.0 km || 
|-id=116 bgcolor=#E9E9E9
| 100116 ||  || — || May 21, 1993 || Kitt Peak || Spacewatch || — || align=right | 2.1 km || 
|-id=117 bgcolor=#d6d6d6
| 100117 ||  || — || May 25, 1993 || Kitt Peak || Spacewatch || HYG || align=right | 4.5 km || 
|-id=118 bgcolor=#fefefe
| 100118 ||  || — || June 13, 1993 || Siding Spring || R. H. McNaught || PHO || align=right | 2.9 km || 
|-id=119 bgcolor=#fefefe
| 100119 || 1993 OB || — || July 16, 1993 || Palomar || E. F. Helin || PHO || align=right | 5.4 km || 
|-id=120 bgcolor=#E9E9E9
| 100120 ||  || — || July 20, 1993 || La Silla || E. W. Elst || — || align=right | 5.2 km || 
|-id=121 bgcolor=#E9E9E9
| 100121 ||  || — || July 20, 1993 || La Silla || E. W. Elst || ADE || align=right | 4.7 km || 
|-id=122 bgcolor=#d6d6d6
| 100122 Alpes Maritimes ||  ||  || August 15, 1993 || Caussols || CERGA || HYG || align=right | 6.1 km || 
|-id=123 bgcolor=#E9E9E9
| 100123 ||  || — || August 17, 1993 || Caussols || E. W. Elst || — || align=right | 2.1 km || 
|-id=124 bgcolor=#fefefe
| 100124 ||  || — || August 20, 1993 || La Silla || E. W. Elst || — || align=right | 1.5 km || 
|-id=125 bgcolor=#E9E9E9
| 100125 ||  || — || August 20, 1993 || La Silla || E. W. Elst || — || align=right | 2.8 km || 
|-id=126 bgcolor=#E9E9E9
| 100126 ||  || — || August 20, 1993 || La Silla || E. W. Elst || — || align=right | 2.8 km || 
|-id=127 bgcolor=#fefefe
| 100127 ||  || — || August 20, 1993 || La Silla || E. W. Elst || NYS || align=right | 1.4 km || 
|-id=128 bgcolor=#E9E9E9
| 100128 ||  || — || August 20, 1993 || La Silla || E. W. Elst || — || align=right | 2.9 km || 
|-id=129 bgcolor=#fefefe
| 100129 ||  || — || September 15, 1993 || Kitt Peak || Spacewatch || NYS || align=right data-sort-value="0.91" | 910 m || 
|-id=130 bgcolor=#E9E9E9
| 100130 ||  || — || September 12, 1993 || Palomar || E. F. Helin || — || align=right | 4.0 km || 
|-id=131 bgcolor=#fefefe
| 100131 ||  || — || September 15, 1993 || La Silla || E. W. Elst || — || align=right | 3.3 km || 
|-id=132 bgcolor=#E9E9E9
| 100132 ||  || — || September 14, 1993 || La Silla || H. Debehogne, E. W. Elst || NEM || align=right | 3.7 km || 
|-id=133 bgcolor=#d6d6d6
| 100133 Demosthenes ||  ||  || September 15, 1993 || La Silla || E. W. Elst || SHU3:2 || align=right | 9.4 km || 
|-id=134 bgcolor=#E9E9E9
| 100134 ||  || — || September 15, 1993 || La Silla || E. W. Elst || — || align=right | 3.2 km || 
|-id=135 bgcolor=#E9E9E9
| 100135 ||  || — || September 15, 1993 || La Silla || H. Debehogne, E. W. Elst || — || align=right | 1.3 km || 
|-id=136 bgcolor=#E9E9E9
| 100136 ||  || — || September 19, 1993 || Caussols || E. W. Elst || — || align=right | 3.2 km || 
|-id=137 bgcolor=#d6d6d6
| 100137 ||  || — || September 17, 1993 || La Silla || E. W. Elst || — || align=right | 3.5 km || 
|-id=138 bgcolor=#E9E9E9
| 100138 ||  || — || September 16, 1993 || La Silla || H. Debehogne, E. W. Elst || — || align=right | 4.0 km || 
|-id=139 bgcolor=#E9E9E9
| 100139 || 1993 TS || — || October 11, 1993 || Kitami || K. Endate, K. Watanabe || — || align=right | 2.6 km || 
|-id=140 bgcolor=#fefefe
| 100140 ||  || — || October 9, 1993 || Kitt Peak || Spacewatch || — || align=right | 1.3 km || 
|-id=141 bgcolor=#E9E9E9
| 100141 ||  || — || October 8, 1993 || Kitt Peak || Spacewatch || — || align=right | 1.7 km || 
|-id=142 bgcolor=#fefefe
| 100142 ||  || — || October 9, 1993 || Kitt Peak || Spacewatch || FLO || align=right | 1.3 km || 
|-id=143 bgcolor=#E9E9E9
| 100143 ||  || — || October 15, 1993 || Kitt Peak || Spacewatch || — || align=right | 1.9 km || 
|-id=144 bgcolor=#fefefe
| 100144 ||  || — || October 9, 1993 || La Silla || E. W. Elst || — || align=right | 1.3 km || 
|-id=145 bgcolor=#E9E9E9
| 100145 ||  || — || October 9, 1993 || La Silla || E. W. Elst || AGN || align=right | 1.9 km || 
|-id=146 bgcolor=#E9E9E9
| 100146 ||  || — || October 9, 1993 || La Silla || E. W. Elst || — || align=right | 4.7 km || 
|-id=147 bgcolor=#E9E9E9
| 100147 ||  || — || October 9, 1993 || La Silla || E. W. Elst || — || align=right | 1.7 km || 
|-id=148 bgcolor=#E9E9E9
| 100148 ||  || — || October 9, 1993 || La Silla || E. W. Elst || — || align=right | 5.2 km || 
|-id=149 bgcolor=#E9E9E9
| 100149 ||  || — || October 9, 1993 || La Silla || E. W. Elst || — || align=right | 1.8 km || 
|-id=150 bgcolor=#fefefe
| 100150 ||  || — || October 9, 1993 || La Silla || E. W. Elst || — || align=right | 1.6 km || 
|-id=151 bgcolor=#E9E9E9
| 100151 ||  || — || October 9, 1993 || La Silla || E. W. Elst || — || align=right | 1.7 km || 
|-id=152 bgcolor=#E9E9E9
| 100152 ||  || — || October 9, 1993 || La Silla || E. W. Elst || — || align=right | 4.6 km || 
|-id=153 bgcolor=#E9E9E9
| 100153 ||  || — || October 9, 1993 || La Silla || E. W. Elst || — || align=right | 1.9 km || 
|-id=154 bgcolor=#E9E9E9
| 100154 ||  || — || October 9, 1993 || La Silla || E. W. Elst || — || align=right | 3.6 km || 
|-id=155 bgcolor=#E9E9E9
| 100155 ||  || — || October 9, 1993 || La Silla || E. W. Elst || — || align=right | 1.6 km || 
|-id=156 bgcolor=#E9E9E9
| 100156 ||  || — || October 9, 1993 || La Silla || E. W. Elst || — || align=right | 1.8 km || 
|-id=157 bgcolor=#E9E9E9
| 100157 ||  || — || October 9, 1993 || La Silla || E. W. Elst || — || align=right | 2.5 km || 
|-id=158 bgcolor=#fefefe
| 100158 ||  || — || October 9, 1993 || La Silla || E. W. Elst || NYS || align=right | 1.3 km || 
|-id=159 bgcolor=#E9E9E9
| 100159 ||  || — || October 9, 1993 || La Silla || E. W. Elst || — || align=right | 3.0 km || 
|-id=160 bgcolor=#E9E9E9
| 100160 ||  || — || October 9, 1993 || La Silla || E. W. Elst || — || align=right | 2.1 km || 
|-id=161 bgcolor=#d6d6d6
| 100161 ||  || — || October 9, 1993 || La Silla || E. W. Elst || KOR || align=right | 2.5 km || 
|-id=162 bgcolor=#E9E9E9
| 100162 ||  || — || October 9, 1993 || La Silla || E. W. Elst || — || align=right | 4.2 km || 
|-id=163 bgcolor=#E9E9E9
| 100163 ||  || — || October 9, 1993 || La Silla || E. W. Elst || RAF || align=right | 1.8 km || 
|-id=164 bgcolor=#E9E9E9
| 100164 ||  || — || October 9, 1993 || La Silla || E. W. Elst || — || align=right | 1.9 km || 
|-id=165 bgcolor=#E9E9E9
| 100165 ||  || — || October 9, 1993 || La Silla || E. W. Elst || PAD || align=right | 4.9 km || 
|-id=166 bgcolor=#E9E9E9
| 100166 ||  || — || October 20, 1993 || Kitt Peak || Spacewatch || — || align=right | 1.5 km || 
|-id=167 bgcolor=#E9E9E9
| 100167 ||  || — || October 21, 1993 || Kitt Peak || Spacewatch || — || align=right | 1.8 km || 
|-id=168 bgcolor=#E9E9E9
| 100168 ||  || — || October 20, 1993 || La Silla || E. W. Elst || — || align=right | 1.4 km || 
|-id=169 bgcolor=#E9E9E9
| 100169 ||  || — || October 20, 1993 || La Silla || E. W. Elst || — || align=right | 1.9 km || 
|-id=170 bgcolor=#d6d6d6
| 100170 ||  || — || October 20, 1993 || La Silla || E. W. Elst || — || align=right | 5.8 km || 
|-id=171 bgcolor=#fefefe
| 100171 ||  || — || October 20, 1993 || La Silla || E. W. Elst || V || align=right | 1.2 km || 
|-id=172 bgcolor=#E9E9E9
| 100172 || 1993 WL || — || November 17, 1993 || Kitt Peak || Spacewatch || — || align=right | 2.0 km || 
|-id=173 bgcolor=#fefefe
| 100173 || 1993 XZ || — || December 11, 1993 || Oizumi || T. Kobayashi || NYS || align=right | 1.4 km || 
|-id=174 bgcolor=#E9E9E9
| 100174 ||  || — || January 12, 1994 || Stroncone || A. Vagnozzi || NEM || align=right | 3.8 km || 
|-id=175 bgcolor=#d6d6d6
| 100175 ||  || — || January 5, 1994 || Kitt Peak || Spacewatch || — || align=right | 5.7 km || 
|-id=176 bgcolor=#d6d6d6
| 100176 ||  || — || January 5, 1994 || Kitt Peak || Spacewatch || — || align=right | 4.3 km || 
|-id=177 bgcolor=#d6d6d6
| 100177 ||  || — || January 5, 1994 || Kitt Peak || Spacewatch || — || align=right | 4.7 km || 
|-id=178 bgcolor=#fefefe
| 100178 ||  || — || January 6, 1994 || Kitt Peak || Spacewatch || — || align=right | 1.2 km || 
|-id=179 bgcolor=#E9E9E9
| 100179 ||  || — || January 7, 1994 || Kitt Peak || Spacewatch || — || align=right | 3.8 km || 
|-id=180 bgcolor=#d6d6d6
| 100180 ||  || — || January 8, 1994 || Kitt Peak || Spacewatch || — || align=right | 4.1 km || 
|-id=181 bgcolor=#fefefe
| 100181 ||  || — || January 8, 1994 || Kitt Peak || Spacewatch || FLO || align=right | 1.2 km || 
|-id=182 bgcolor=#fefefe
| 100182 ||  || — || January 8, 1994 || Kitt Peak || Spacewatch || — || align=right | 1.2 km || 
|-id=183 bgcolor=#E9E9E9
| 100183 ||  || — || January 8, 1994 || Kitt Peak || Spacewatch || — || align=right | 2.3 km || 
|-id=184 bgcolor=#E9E9E9
| 100184 ||  || — || January 11, 1994 || Kitt Peak || Spacewatch || — || align=right | 3.5 km || 
|-id=185 bgcolor=#fefefe
| 100185 ||  || — || January 11, 1994 || Kitt Peak || Spacewatch || — || align=right data-sort-value="0.98" | 980 m || 
|-id=186 bgcolor=#fefefe
| 100186 ||  || — || January 19, 1994 || Kitt Peak || Spacewatch || NYS || align=right | 1.3 km || 
|-id=187 bgcolor=#fefefe
| 100187 ||  || — || January 29, 1994 || Stroncone || A. Vagnozzi || — || align=right | 1.0 km || 
|-id=188 bgcolor=#d6d6d6
| 100188 ||  || — || February 9, 1994 || Farra d'Isonzo || Farra d'Isonzo || — || align=right | 4.6 km || 
|-id=189 bgcolor=#E9E9E9
| 100189 ||  || — || February 10, 1994 || Kitt Peak || Spacewatch || — || align=right | 3.4 km || 
|-id=190 bgcolor=#E9E9E9
| 100190 ||  || — || February 10, 1994 || Kitt Peak || Spacewatch || — || align=right | 2.9 km || 
|-id=191 bgcolor=#fefefe
| 100191 ||  || — || February 11, 1994 || Kitt Peak || Spacewatch || NYS || align=right | 1.0 km || 
|-id=192 bgcolor=#fefefe
| 100192 ||  || — || February 12, 1994 || Kitt Peak || Spacewatch || — || align=right | 1.8 km || 
|-id=193 bgcolor=#fefefe
| 100193 ||  || — || February 15, 1994 || Kitt Peak || Spacewatch || — || align=right | 1.4 km || 
|-id=194 bgcolor=#d6d6d6
| 100194 ||  || — || February 7, 1994 || La Silla || E. W. Elst || — || align=right | 6.0 km || 
|-id=195 bgcolor=#d6d6d6
| 100195 ||  || — || February 7, 1994 || La Silla || E. W. Elst || — || align=right | 4.0 km || 
|-id=196 bgcolor=#d6d6d6
| 100196 ||  || — || February 8, 1994 || La Silla || E. W. Elst || — || align=right | 7.0 km || 
|-id=197 bgcolor=#fefefe
| 100197 ||  || — || February 8, 1994 || La Silla || E. W. Elst || — || align=right | 1.6 km || 
|-id=198 bgcolor=#d6d6d6
| 100198 ||  || — || March 9, 1994 || Stroncone || A. Vagnozzi || — || align=right | 2.9 km || 
|-id=199 bgcolor=#d6d6d6
| 100199 ||  || — || March 4, 1994 || Kitt Peak || Spacewatch || EOS || align=right | 4.7 km || 
|-id=200 bgcolor=#fefefe
| 100200 ||  || — || March 5, 1994 || Kitt Peak || Spacewatch || NYS || align=right | 1.2 km || 
|}

100201–100300 

|-bgcolor=#fefefe
| 100201 || 1994 FD || — || March 19, 1994 || Siding Spring || R. H. McNaught || H || align=right data-sort-value="0.88" | 880 m || 
|-id=202 bgcolor=#fefefe
| 100202 || 1994 GB || — || April 2, 1994 || Siding Spring || R. H. McNaught || H || align=right | 1.5 km || 
|-id=203 bgcolor=#fefefe
| 100203 ||  || — || April 6, 1994 || Kitt Peak || Spacewatch || — || align=right | 1.5 km || 
|-id=204 bgcolor=#d6d6d6
| 100204 ||  || — || April 6, 1994 || Kitt Peak || Spacewatch || HYG || align=right | 5.5 km || 
|-id=205 bgcolor=#fefefe
| 100205 ||  || — || April 11, 1994 || Kitt Peak || Spacewatch || NYS || align=right | 1.4 km || 
|-id=206 bgcolor=#d6d6d6
| 100206 || 1994 HW || — || April 16, 1994 || Kitt Peak || Spacewatch || — || align=right | 4.1 km || 
|-id=207 bgcolor=#fefefe
| 100207 ||  || — || April 19, 1994 || Kitt Peak || Spacewatch || — || align=right | 1.5 km || 
|-id=208 bgcolor=#d6d6d6
| 100208 ||  || — || May 1, 1994 || Kitt Peak || Spacewatch || — || align=right | 3.9 km || 
|-id=209 bgcolor=#fefefe
| 100209 ||  || — || May 4, 1994 || Kitt Peak || Spacewatch || NYS || align=right | 1.2 km || 
|-id=210 bgcolor=#d6d6d6
| 100210 ||  || — || June 15, 1994 || Siding Spring || G. J. Garradd || — || align=right | 2.9 km || 
|-id=211 bgcolor=#fefefe
| 100211 ||  || — || August 7, 1994 || Siding Spring || G. J. Garradd || H || align=right | 1.6 km || 
|-id=212 bgcolor=#d6d6d6
| 100212 ||  || — || August 10, 1994 || La Silla || E. W. Elst || MEL || align=right | 5.8 km || 
|-id=213 bgcolor=#d6d6d6
| 100213 ||  || — || August 10, 1994 || La Silla || E. W. Elst || THM || align=right | 4.0 km || 
|-id=214 bgcolor=#fefefe
| 100214 ||  || — || August 10, 1994 || La Silla || E. W. Elst || — || align=right | 3.0 km || 
|-id=215 bgcolor=#d6d6d6
| 100215 ||  || — || August 10, 1994 || La Silla || E. W. Elst || — || align=right | 3.4 km || 
|-id=216 bgcolor=#fefefe
| 100216 ||  || — || August 10, 1994 || La Silla || E. W. Elst || EUT || align=right data-sort-value="0.92" | 920 m || 
|-id=217 bgcolor=#d6d6d6
| 100217 ||  || — || August 10, 1994 || La Silla || E. W. Elst || — || align=right | 5.5 km || 
|-id=218 bgcolor=#E9E9E9
| 100218 ||  || — || August 10, 1994 || La Silla || E. W. Elst || — || align=right | 1.7 km || 
|-id=219 bgcolor=#fefefe
| 100219 ||  || — || August 10, 1994 || La Silla || E. W. Elst || NYS || align=right data-sort-value="0.88" | 880 m || 
|-id=220 bgcolor=#d6d6d6
| 100220 ||  || — || August 10, 1994 || La Silla || E. W. Elst || — || align=right | 4.0 km || 
|-id=221 bgcolor=#E9E9E9
| 100221 ||  || — || August 10, 1994 || La Silla || E. W. Elst || — || align=right | 2.1 km || 
|-id=222 bgcolor=#E9E9E9
| 100222 ||  || — || August 10, 1994 || La Silla || E. W. Elst || — || align=right | 1.6 km || 
|-id=223 bgcolor=#d6d6d6
| 100223 ||  || — || August 10, 1994 || La Silla || E. W. Elst || — || align=right | 5.8 km || 
|-id=224 bgcolor=#E9E9E9
| 100224 ||  || — || August 10, 1994 || La Silla || E. W. Elst || — || align=right | 2.0 km || 
|-id=225 bgcolor=#d6d6d6
| 100225 ||  || — || August 10, 1994 || La Silla || E. W. Elst || — || align=right | 4.3 km || 
|-id=226 bgcolor=#E9E9E9
| 100226 ||  || — || August 10, 1994 || La Silla || E. W. Elst || — || align=right | 4.1 km || 
|-id=227 bgcolor=#E9E9E9
| 100227 ||  || — || August 10, 1994 || La Silla || E. W. Elst || — || align=right | 1.9 km || 
|-id=228 bgcolor=#fefefe
| 100228 ||  || — || August 10, 1994 || La Silla || E. W. Elst || NYS || align=right | 1.2 km || 
|-id=229 bgcolor=#d6d6d6
| 100229 Jeanbailly ||  ||  || August 10, 1994 || La Silla || E. W. Elst || 3:2slow || align=right | 8.9 km || 
|-id=230 bgcolor=#d6d6d6
| 100230 ||  || — || August 12, 1994 || La Silla || E. W. Elst || — || align=right | 4.2 km || 
|-id=231 bgcolor=#d6d6d6
| 100231 Monceau ||  ||  || August 12, 1994 || La Silla || E. W. Elst || SHU3:2 || align=right | 9.3 km || 
|-id=232 bgcolor=#E9E9E9
| 100232 ||  || — || August 12, 1994 || La Silla || E. W. Elst || — || align=right | 4.8 km || 
|-id=233 bgcolor=#d6d6d6
| 100233 ||  || — || August 12, 1994 || La Silla || E. W. Elst || EUP || align=right | 8.0 km || 
|-id=234 bgcolor=#d6d6d6
| 100234 ||  || — || August 12, 1994 || La Silla || E. W. Elst || — || align=right | 5.9 km || 
|-id=235 bgcolor=#E9E9E9
| 100235 ||  || — || August 12, 1994 || La Silla || E. W. Elst || — || align=right | 1.5 km || 
|-id=236 bgcolor=#fefefe
| 100236 ||  || — || August 12, 1994 || La Silla || E. W. Elst || — || align=right | 1.6 km || 
|-id=237 bgcolor=#E9E9E9
| 100237 ||  || — || August 12, 1994 || La Silla || E. W. Elst || — || align=right | 1.8 km || 
|-id=238 bgcolor=#fefefe
| 100238 ||  || — || August 12, 1994 || La Silla || E. W. Elst || — || align=right | 1.8 km || 
|-id=239 bgcolor=#d6d6d6
| 100239 ||  || — || August 12, 1994 || La Silla || E. W. Elst || HYG || align=right | 5.4 km || 
|-id=240 bgcolor=#d6d6d6
| 100240 ||  || — || August 10, 1994 || La Silla || E. W. Elst || — || align=right | 6.6 km || 
|-id=241 bgcolor=#fefefe
| 100241 ||  || — || August 10, 1994 || La Silla || E. W. Elst || NYS || align=right | 1.5 km || 
|-id=242 bgcolor=#fefefe
| 100242 ||  || — || August 10, 1994 || La Silla || E. W. Elst || NYS || align=right | 1.3 km || 
|-id=243 bgcolor=#fefefe
| 100243 ||  || — || August 10, 1994 || La Silla || E. W. Elst || NYS || align=right | 1.4 km || 
|-id=244 bgcolor=#d6d6d6
| 100244 || 1994 QB || — || August 16, 1994 || Siding Spring || G. J. Garradd || — || align=right | 6.4 km || 
|-id=245 bgcolor=#fefefe
| 100245 ||  || — || September 2, 1994 || Kitt Peak || Spacewatch || — || align=right | 1.5 km || 
|-id=246 bgcolor=#fefefe
| 100246 ||  || — || September 2, 1994 || Kitt Peak || Spacewatch || V || align=right | 1.3 km || 
|-id=247 bgcolor=#fefefe
| 100247 ||  || — || September 12, 1994 || Kitt Peak || Spacewatch || — || align=right | 1.3 km || 
|-id=248 bgcolor=#E9E9E9
| 100248 ||  || — || September 3, 1994 || La Silla || E. W. Elst || — || align=right | 1.7 km || 
|-id=249 bgcolor=#d6d6d6
| 100249 ||  || — || September 12, 1994 || Kitt Peak || Spacewatch || — || align=right | 5.7 km || 
|-id=250 bgcolor=#fefefe
| 100250 ||  || — || September 3, 1994 || La Silla || E. W. Elst || ERI || align=right | 2.9 km || 
|-id=251 bgcolor=#d6d6d6
| 100251 ||  || — || September 3, 1994 || La Silla || E. W. Elst || — || align=right | 6.7 km || 
|-id=252 bgcolor=#d6d6d6
| 100252 ||  || — || September 5, 1994 || La Silla || E. W. Elst || EOS || align=right | 3.6 km || 
|-id=253 bgcolor=#d6d6d6
| 100253 ||  || — || September 27, 1994 || Kitt Peak || Spacewatch || — || align=right | 3.4 km || 
|-id=254 bgcolor=#E9E9E9
| 100254 ||  || — || September 28, 1994 || Kitt Peak || Spacewatch || — || align=right | 2.8 km || 
|-id=255 bgcolor=#E9E9E9
| 100255 ||  || — || September 28, 1994 || Kitt Peak || Spacewatch || ADE || align=right | 3.2 km || 
|-id=256 bgcolor=#d6d6d6
| 100256 ||  || — || September 28, 1994 || Kitt Peak || Spacewatch || — || align=right | 3.7 km || 
|-id=257 bgcolor=#E9E9E9
| 100257 ||  || — || September 28, 1994 || Kitt Peak || Spacewatch || — || align=right | 2.4 km || 
|-id=258 bgcolor=#d6d6d6
| 100258 ||  || — || September 29, 1994 || Kitt Peak || Spacewatch || THM || align=right | 4.7 km || 
|-id=259 bgcolor=#E9E9E9
| 100259 ||  || — || October 2, 1994 || Kitt Peak || Spacewatch || — || align=right | 3.8 km || 
|-id=260 bgcolor=#fefefe
| 100260 ||  || — || October 2, 1994 || Kitt Peak || Spacewatch || ERI || align=right | 2.5 km || 
|-id=261 bgcolor=#E9E9E9
| 100261 ||  || — || October 4, 1994 || Kitt Peak || Spacewatch || — || align=right | 2.8 km || 
|-id=262 bgcolor=#fefefe
| 100262 ||  || — || October 9, 1994 || Kitt Peak || Spacewatch || — || align=right | 1.9 km || 
|-id=263 bgcolor=#E9E9E9
| 100263 ||  || — || October 10, 1994 || Kitt Peak || Spacewatch || — || align=right | 3.8 km || 
|-id=264 bgcolor=#E9E9E9
| 100264 ||  || — || October 10, 1994 || Kitt Peak || Spacewatch || — || align=right | 1.8 km || 
|-id=265 bgcolor=#d6d6d6
| 100265 ||  || — || October 12, 1994 || Kitt Peak || Spacewatch || THM || align=right | 6.2 km || 
|-id=266 bgcolor=#E9E9E9
| 100266 Sadamisaki ||  ||  || October 14, 1994 || Kuma Kogen || A. Nakamura || — || align=right | 4.1 km || 
|-id=267 bgcolor=#E9E9E9
| 100267 JAXA ||  ||  || October 14, 1994 || Kiso || I. Satō, M. Abe, H. Araki || — || align=right | 2.2 km || 
|-id=268 bgcolor=#fefefe
| 100268 Rosenthal ||  ||  || October 5, 1994 || Tautenburg Observatory || F. Börngen || — || align=right | 2.2 km || 
|-id=269 bgcolor=#d6d6d6
| 100269 ||  || — || October 28, 1994 || Kitt Peak || Spacewatch || — || align=right | 7.2 km || 
|-id=270 bgcolor=#fefefe
| 100270 || 1994 VQ || — || November 1, 1994 || Oizumi || T. Kobayashi || MAS || align=right | 2.0 km || 
|-id=271 bgcolor=#E9E9E9
| 100271 ||  || — || November 3, 1994 || Oizumi || T. Kobayashi || RAF || align=right | 2.5 km || 
|-id=272 bgcolor=#d6d6d6
| 100272 ||  || — || November 1, 1994 || Kitami || K. Endate, K. Watanabe || — || align=right | 5.1 km || 
|-id=273 bgcolor=#fefefe
| 100273 ||  || — || November 27, 1994 || Oizumi || T. Kobayashi || — || align=right | 3.6 km || 
|-id=274 bgcolor=#fefefe
| 100274 ||  || — || November 28, 1994 || Kitt Peak || Spacewatch || — || align=right | 1.2 km || 
|-id=275 bgcolor=#d6d6d6
| 100275 ||  || — || November 28, 1994 || Kitt Peak || Spacewatch || — || align=right | 4.8 km || 
|-id=276 bgcolor=#FA8072
| 100276 || 1994 XV || — || December 6, 1994 || Siding Spring || R. H. McNaught || — || align=right | 2.1 km || 
|-id=277 bgcolor=#fefefe
| 100277 ||  || — || December 2, 1994 || Ondřejov || P. Pravec || — || align=right | 3.6 km || 
|-id=278 bgcolor=#E9E9E9
| 100278 || 1994 YN || — || December 28, 1994 || Oizumi || T. Kobayashi || — || align=right | 3.8 km || 
|-id=279 bgcolor=#fefefe
| 100279 ||  || — || December 31, 1994 || Kitt Peak || Spacewatch || MAS || align=right | 1.0 km || 
|-id=280 bgcolor=#E9E9E9
| 100280 ||  || — || January 26, 1995 || Oizumi || T. Kobayashi || — || align=right | 2.0 km || 
|-id=281 bgcolor=#fefefe
| 100281 ||  || — || January 29, 1995 || Kitt Peak || Spacewatch || — || align=right | 2.7 km || 
|-id=282 bgcolor=#E9E9E9
| 100282 ||  || — || January 29, 1995 || Kitt Peak || Spacewatch || — || align=right | 3.3 km || 
|-id=283 bgcolor=#d6d6d6
| 100283 ||  || — || January 29, 1995 || Kitt Peak || Spacewatch || — || align=right | 4.9 km || 
|-id=284 bgcolor=#fefefe
| 100284 ||  || — || January 31, 1995 || Kitt Peak || Spacewatch || — || align=right | 1.1 km || 
|-id=285 bgcolor=#d6d6d6
| 100285 ||  || — || February 1, 1995 || Kitt Peak || Spacewatch || — || align=right | 2.6 km || 
|-id=286 bgcolor=#E9E9E9
| 100286 ||  || — || February 1, 1995 || Kitt Peak || Spacewatch || — || align=right | 3.9 km || 
|-id=287 bgcolor=#fefefe
| 100287 ||  || — || February 1, 1995 || Kitt Peak || Spacewatch || — || align=right | 1.1 km || 
|-id=288 bgcolor=#E9E9E9
| 100288 ||  || — || February 1, 1995 || Kitt Peak || Spacewatch || — || align=right | 1.8 km || 
|-id=289 bgcolor=#E9E9E9
| 100289 ||  || — || February 1, 1995 || Kitt Peak || Spacewatch || — || align=right | 1.4 km || 
|-id=290 bgcolor=#E9E9E9
| 100290 ||  || — || February 1, 1995 || Kitt Peak || Spacewatch || — || align=right | 1.7 km || 
|-id=291 bgcolor=#E9E9E9
| 100291 ||  || — || February 3, 1995 || Kitt Peak || Spacewatch || — || align=right | 1.9 km || 
|-id=292 bgcolor=#E9E9E9
| 100292 Harmandir ||  ||  || February 28, 1995 || Colleverde || V. S. Casulli || — || align=right | 2.3 km || 
|-id=293 bgcolor=#E9E9E9
| 100293 ||  || — || February 24, 1995 || Kitt Peak || Spacewatch || — || align=right | 3.2 km || 
|-id=294 bgcolor=#d6d6d6
| 100294 ||  || — || February 24, 1995 || Kitt Peak || Spacewatch || THM || align=right | 4.7 km || 
|-id=295 bgcolor=#d6d6d6
| 100295 ||  || — || March 2, 1995 || Kitt Peak || Spacewatch || KAR || align=right | 2.2 km || 
|-id=296 bgcolor=#E9E9E9
| 100296 || 1995 FB || — || March 21, 1995 || Stroncone || Santa Lucia Obs. || MAR || align=right | 2.4 km || 
|-id=297 bgcolor=#d6d6d6
| 100297 ||  || — || March 23, 1995 || Kitt Peak || Spacewatch || KOR || align=right | 2.3 km || 
|-id=298 bgcolor=#fefefe
| 100298 ||  || — || March 23, 1995 || Kitt Peak || Spacewatch || — || align=right data-sort-value="0.92" | 920 m || 
|-id=299 bgcolor=#E9E9E9
| 100299 ||  || — || March 25, 1995 || Kitt Peak || Spacewatch || — || align=right | 2.4 km || 
|-id=300 bgcolor=#E9E9E9
| 100300 ||  || — || March 25, 1995 || Kitt Peak || Spacewatch || — || align=right | 2.7 km || 
|}

100301–100400 

|-bgcolor=#d6d6d6
| 100301 ||  || — || March 27, 1995 || Kitt Peak || Spacewatch || — || align=right | 4.1 km || 
|-id=302 bgcolor=#E9E9E9
| 100302 ||  || — || March 27, 1995 || Kitt Peak || Spacewatch || ADE || align=right | 3.0 km || 
|-id=303 bgcolor=#d6d6d6
| 100303 ||  || — || March 27, 1995 || Kitt Peak || Spacewatch || — || align=right | 3.4 km || 
|-id=304 bgcolor=#fefefe
| 100304 ||  || — || March 31, 1995 || Kitt Peak || Spacewatch || — || align=right data-sort-value="0.89" | 890 m || 
|-id=305 bgcolor=#E9E9E9
| 100305 ||  || — || April 1, 1995 || Kitt Peak || Spacewatch || — || align=right | 2.0 km || 
|-id=306 bgcolor=#E9E9E9
| 100306 ||  || — || April 2, 1995 || Kitt Peak || Spacewatch || — || align=right | 1.9 km || 
|-id=307 bgcolor=#E9E9E9
| 100307 ||  || — || April 8, 1995 || Kitt Peak || T. J. Balonek || — || align=right | 3.1 km || 
|-id=308 bgcolor=#fefefe
| 100308 ČAS || 1995 HB ||  || April 21, 1995 || Ondřejov || P. Pravec, L. Kotková || FLO || align=right | 1.5 km || 
|-id=309 bgcolor=#E9E9E9
| 100309 Misuzukaneko || 1995 HD ||  || April 20, 1995 || Kuma Kogen || A. Nakamura || — || align=right | 2.2 km || 
|-id=310 bgcolor=#E9E9E9
| 100310 ||  || — || April 26, 1995 || Kitt Peak || Spacewatch || HEN || align=right | 1.9 km || 
|-id=311 bgcolor=#E9E9E9
| 100311 ||  || — || April 26, 1995 || Kitt Peak || Spacewatch || — || align=right | 3.7 km || 
|-id=312 bgcolor=#fefefe
| 100312 || 1995 LQ || — || June 3, 1995 || Kitt Peak || Spacewatch || NYS || align=right | 1.3 km || 
|-id=313 bgcolor=#E9E9E9
| 100313 ||  || — || June 5, 1995 || Xinglong || SCAP || — || align=right | 1.7 km || 
|-id=314 bgcolor=#d6d6d6
| 100314 ||  || — || June 22, 1995 || Kitt Peak || Spacewatch || — || align=right | 5.6 km || 
|-id=315 bgcolor=#E9E9E9
| 100315 ||  || — || June 23, 1995 || Kitt Peak || Spacewatch || — || align=right | 3.1 km || 
|-id=316 bgcolor=#FA8072
| 100316 ||  || — || June 24, 1995 || Kitt Peak || Spacewatch || — || align=right | 1.7 km || 
|-id=317 bgcolor=#E9E9E9
| 100317 ||  || — || June 25, 1995 || Kitt Peak || Spacewatch || — || align=right | 4.9 km || 
|-id=318 bgcolor=#d6d6d6
| 100318 ||  || — || June 29, 1995 || Kitt Peak || Spacewatch || — || align=right | 5.0 km || 
|-id=319 bgcolor=#fefefe
| 100319 ||  || — || June 22, 1995 || Kitt Peak || Spacewatch || V || align=right | 1.2 km || 
|-id=320 bgcolor=#d6d6d6
| 100320 ||  || — || June 22, 1995 || Kitt Peak || Spacewatch || — || align=right | 3.0 km || 
|-id=321 bgcolor=#fefefe
| 100321 ||  || — || June 29, 1995 || Kitt Peak || Spacewatch || V || align=right data-sort-value="0.77" | 770 m || 
|-id=322 bgcolor=#fefefe
| 100322 ||  || — || June 29, 1995 || Kitt Peak || Spacewatch || V || align=right | 1.2 km || 
|-id=323 bgcolor=#fefefe
| 100323 ||  || — || July 22, 1995 || Church Stretton || S. P. Laurie || — || align=right | 1.6 km || 
|-id=324 bgcolor=#fefefe
| 100324 ||  || — || July 22, 1995 || Kitt Peak || Spacewatch || — || align=right | 1.5 km || 
|-id=325 bgcolor=#fefefe
| 100325 ||  || — || July 22, 1995 || Kitt Peak || Spacewatch || — || align=right | 1.8 km || 
|-id=326 bgcolor=#d6d6d6
| 100326 ||  || — || July 22, 1995 || Kitt Peak || Spacewatch || KOR || align=right | 2.6 km || 
|-id=327 bgcolor=#d6d6d6
| 100327 || 1995 QX || — || August 22, 1995 || Uto || F. Uto || EUP || align=right | 9.8 km || 
|-id=328 bgcolor=#fefefe
| 100328 ||  || — || August 17, 1995 || Kitt Peak || Spacewatch || — || align=right | 1.6 km || 
|-id=329 bgcolor=#d6d6d6
| 100329 ||  || — || August 28, 1995 || Kitt Peak || Spacewatch || URS || align=right | 6.6 km || 
|-id=330 bgcolor=#d6d6d6
| 100330 ||  || — || August 28, 1995 || Kitt Peak || Spacewatch || — || align=right | 4.5 km || 
|-id=331 bgcolor=#fefefe
| 100331 ||  || — || August 23, 1995 || Xinglong || SCAP || V || align=right | 1.1 km || 
|-id=332 bgcolor=#fefefe
| 100332 ||  || — || August 20, 1995 || Kitt Peak || Spacewatch || NYS || align=right | 1.1 km || 
|-id=333 bgcolor=#FA8072
| 100333 ||  || — || September 22, 1995 || Siding Spring || R. H. McNaught || — || align=right | 2.1 km || 
|-id=334 bgcolor=#fefefe
| 100334 ||  || — || September 17, 1995 || Kitt Peak || Spacewatch || NYS || align=right | 1.4 km || 
|-id=335 bgcolor=#d6d6d6
| 100335 ||  || — || September 18, 1995 || Kitt Peak || Spacewatch || EOS || align=right | 3.0 km || 
|-id=336 bgcolor=#fefefe
| 100336 ||  || — || September 18, 1995 || Kitt Peak || Spacewatch || — || align=right data-sort-value="0.99" | 990 m || 
|-id=337 bgcolor=#d6d6d6
| 100337 ||  || — || September 24, 1995 || Kitt Peak || Spacewatch || EOS || align=right | 3.9 km || 
|-id=338 bgcolor=#d6d6d6
| 100338 ||  || — || September 25, 1995 || Kitt Peak || Spacewatch || — || align=right | 4.9 km || 
|-id=339 bgcolor=#d6d6d6
| 100339 ||  || — || September 25, 1995 || Kitt Peak || Spacewatch || — || align=right | 6.9 km || 
|-id=340 bgcolor=#d6d6d6
| 100340 ||  || — || September 25, 1995 || Kitt Peak || Spacewatch || THM || align=right | 4.9 km || 
|-id=341 bgcolor=#FA8072
| 100341 ||  || — || September 25, 1995 || Kitt Peak || Spacewatch || — || align=right | 1.7 km || 
|-id=342 bgcolor=#fefefe
| 100342 ||  || — || September 26, 1995 || Kitt Peak || Spacewatch || — || align=right | 1.4 km || 
|-id=343 bgcolor=#fefefe
| 100343 ||  || — || September 26, 1995 || Kitt Peak || Spacewatch || NYS || align=right data-sort-value="0.93" | 930 m || 
|-id=344 bgcolor=#fefefe
| 100344 ||  || — || September 26, 1995 || Kitt Peak || Spacewatch || — || align=right | 1.7 km || 
|-id=345 bgcolor=#fefefe
| 100345 ||  || — || September 25, 1995 || Kitt Peak || Spacewatch || — || align=right | 1.5 km || 
|-id=346 bgcolor=#E9E9E9
| 100346 ||  || — || September 18, 1995 || Kitt Peak || Spacewatch || — || align=right | 3.2 km || 
|-id=347 bgcolor=#fefefe
| 100347 ||  || — || September 18, 1995 || Kitt Peak || Spacewatch || V || align=right | 1.3 km || 
|-id=348 bgcolor=#d6d6d6
| 100348 ||  || — || September 20, 1995 || Kitt Peak || Spacewatch || — || align=right | 7.8 km || 
|-id=349 bgcolor=#fefefe
| 100349 ||  || — || September 30, 1995 || Kitt Peak || Spacewatch || — || align=right | 1.4 km || 
|-id=350 bgcolor=#d6d6d6
| 100350 ||  || — || September 24, 1995 || Kitt Peak || Spacewatch || THM || align=right | 3.6 km || 
|-id=351 bgcolor=#fefefe
| 100351 ||  || — || September 29, 1995 || Kitt Peak || Spacewatch || MASfast? || align=right data-sort-value="0.91" | 910 m || 
|-id=352 bgcolor=#d6d6d6
| 100352 ||  || — || October 14, 1995 || Stroncone || A. Vagnozzi || THM || align=right | 5.0 km || 
|-id=353 bgcolor=#fefefe
| 100353 ||  || — || October 14, 1995 || Xinglong || SCAP || NYS || align=right | 1.3 km || 
|-id=354 bgcolor=#fefefe
| 100354 ||  || — || October 15, 1995 || Kitt Peak || Spacewatch || NYS || align=right data-sort-value="0.83" | 830 m || 
|-id=355 bgcolor=#fefefe
| 100355 ||  || — || October 15, 1995 || Kitt Peak || Spacewatch || — || align=right | 2.4 km || 
|-id=356 bgcolor=#fefefe
| 100356 ||  || — || October 15, 1995 || Kitt Peak || Spacewatch || NYS || align=right | 1.0 km || 
|-id=357 bgcolor=#d6d6d6
| 100357 ||  || — || October 15, 1995 || Kitt Peak || Spacewatch || — || align=right | 7.0 km || 
|-id=358 bgcolor=#d6d6d6
| 100358 ||  || — || October 24, 1995 || Kleť || Kleť Obs. || — || align=right | 6.3 km || 
|-id=359 bgcolor=#fefefe
| 100359 ||  || — || October 27, 1995 || Oizumi || T. Kobayashi || — || align=right | 1.7 km || 
|-id=360 bgcolor=#E9E9E9
| 100360 ||  || — || October 17, 1995 || Kitt Peak || Spacewatch || — || align=right | 1.4 km || 
|-id=361 bgcolor=#fefefe
| 100361 ||  || — || October 17, 1995 || Kitt Peak || Spacewatch || MAS || align=right | 1.8 km || 
|-id=362 bgcolor=#fefefe
| 100362 ||  || — || October 17, 1995 || Kitt Peak || Spacewatch || — || align=right | 2.0 km || 
|-id=363 bgcolor=#fefefe
| 100363 ||  || — || October 17, 1995 || Kitt Peak || Spacewatch || NYS || align=right | 1.2 km || 
|-id=364 bgcolor=#fefefe
| 100364 ||  || — || October 19, 1995 || Kitt Peak || Spacewatch || NYS || align=right | 1.4 km || 
|-id=365 bgcolor=#fefefe
| 100365 ||  || — || October 21, 1995 || Kitt Peak || Spacewatch || FLO || align=right | 1.3 km || 
|-id=366 bgcolor=#fefefe
| 100366 ||  || — || October 23, 1995 || Kitt Peak || Spacewatch || FLO || align=right | 1.0 km || 
|-id=367 bgcolor=#fefefe
| 100367 ||  || — || October 23, 1995 || Kitt Peak || Spacewatch || — || align=right | 1.3 km || 
|-id=368 bgcolor=#fefefe
| 100368 ||  || — || October 23, 1995 || Kitt Peak || Spacewatch || — || align=right | 1.1 km || 
|-id=369 bgcolor=#fefefe
| 100369 ||  || — || October 20, 1995 || Caussols || E. W. Elst || — || align=right | 1.4 km || 
|-id=370 bgcolor=#fefefe
| 100370 ||  || — || October 20, 1995 || Kitt Peak || Spacewatch || NYS || align=right | 3.5 km || 
|-id=371 bgcolor=#fefefe
| 100371 ||  || — || October 22, 1995 || Kitt Peak || Spacewatch || — || align=right | 1.3 km || 
|-id=372 bgcolor=#fefefe
| 100372 ||  || — || October 17, 1995 || Kitt Peak || Spacewatch || NYS || align=right | 1.3 km || 
|-id=373 bgcolor=#fefefe
| 100373 ||  || — || October 19, 1995 || Kitt Peak || Spacewatch || V || align=right data-sort-value="0.99" | 990 m || 
|-id=374 bgcolor=#d6d6d6
| 100374 ||  || — || October 19, 1995 || Kitt Peak || Spacewatch || — || align=right | 3.7 km || 
|-id=375 bgcolor=#fefefe
| 100375 ||  || — || October 20, 1995 || Kitt Peak || Spacewatch || — || align=right | 1.8 km || 
|-id=376 bgcolor=#E9E9E9
| 100376 ||  || — || October 20, 1995 || Kitt Peak || Spacewatch || — || align=right | 2.0 km || 
|-id=377 bgcolor=#d6d6d6
| 100377 || 1995 VH || — || November 1, 1995 || Oizumi || T. Kobayashi || — || align=right | 6.1 km || 
|-id=378 bgcolor=#E9E9E9
| 100378 ||  || — || November 14, 1995 || Kitt Peak || Spacewatch || — || align=right | 2.3 km || 
|-id=379 bgcolor=#fefefe
| 100379 ||  || — || November 14, 1995 || Kitt Peak || Spacewatch || NYS || align=right | 1.4 km || 
|-id=380 bgcolor=#E9E9E9
| 100380 ||  || — || November 15, 1995 || Kitt Peak || Spacewatch || MRX || align=right | 2.3 km || 
|-id=381 bgcolor=#d6d6d6
| 100381 ||  || — || November 15, 1995 || Kitt Peak || Spacewatch || — || align=right | 6.0 km || 
|-id=382 bgcolor=#fefefe
| 100382 ||  || — || November 15, 1995 || Kitt Peak || Spacewatch || NYS || align=right | 1.4 km || 
|-id=383 bgcolor=#E9E9E9
| 100383 ||  || — || November 15, 1995 || Kitt Peak || Spacewatch || — || align=right | 1.1 km || 
|-id=384 bgcolor=#fefefe
| 100384 ||  || — || November 15, 1995 || Kitt Peak || Spacewatch || MAS || align=right | 1.2 km || 
|-id=385 bgcolor=#fefefe
| 100385 ||  || — || November 15, 1995 || Kitt Peak || Spacewatch || NYS || align=right | 1.2 km || 
|-id=386 bgcolor=#fefefe
| 100386 ||  || — || November 20, 1995 || Farra d'Isonzo || Farra d'Isonzo || NYS || align=right | 1.7 km || 
|-id=387 bgcolor=#d6d6d6
| 100387 ||  || — || November 20, 1995 || Oizumi || T. Kobayashi || — || align=right | 6.0 km || 
|-id=388 bgcolor=#d6d6d6
| 100388 ||  || — || November 28, 1995 || Oizumi || T. Kobayashi || — || align=right | 4.8 km || 
|-id=389 bgcolor=#fefefe
| 100389 ||  || — || November 24, 1995 || Chichibu || N. Satō, T. Urata || V || align=right | 1.2 km || 
|-id=390 bgcolor=#fefefe
| 100390 ||  || — || November 16, 1995 || Kitt Peak || Spacewatch || FLO || align=right | 1.4 km || 
|-id=391 bgcolor=#fefefe
| 100391 ||  || — || November 17, 1995 || Kitt Peak || Spacewatch || NYS || align=right | 1.2 km || 
|-id=392 bgcolor=#fefefe
| 100392 ||  || — || November 17, 1995 || Kitt Peak || Spacewatch || — || align=right | 1.2 km || 
|-id=393 bgcolor=#E9E9E9
| 100393 ||  || — || November 19, 1995 || Kitt Peak || Spacewatch || — || align=right | 2.5 km || 
|-id=394 bgcolor=#fefefe
| 100394 ||  || — || November 20, 1995 || Kitt Peak || Spacewatch || — || align=right | 2.9 km || 
|-id=395 bgcolor=#E9E9E9
| 100395 ||  || — || November 23, 1995 || Kitt Peak || Spacewatch || — || align=right | 1.5 km || 
|-id=396 bgcolor=#fefefe
| 100396 ||  || — || December 16, 1995 || Kitt Peak || Spacewatch || — || align=right | 1.7 km || 
|-id=397 bgcolor=#d6d6d6
| 100397 ||  || — || December 16, 1995 || Kitt Peak || Spacewatch || — || align=right | 5.6 km || 
|-id=398 bgcolor=#fefefe
| 100398 ||  || — || December 16, 1995 || Kitt Peak || Spacewatch || NYS || align=right | 1.2 km || 
|-id=399 bgcolor=#d6d6d6
| 100399 ||  || — || December 16, 1995 || Kitt Peak || Spacewatch || — || align=right | 4.1 km || 
|-id=400 bgcolor=#fefefe
| 100400 ||  || — || December 18, 1995 || Kitt Peak || Spacewatch || — || align=right | 1.6 km || 
|}

100401–100500 

|-bgcolor=#d6d6d6
| 100401 ||  || — || December 22, 1995 || Kitt Peak || Spacewatch || — || align=right | 4.0 km || 
|-id=402 bgcolor=#E9E9E9
| 100402 ||  || — || December 25, 1995 || Kitt Peak || Spacewatch || — || align=right | 1.7 km || 
|-id=403 bgcolor=#fefefe
| 100403 || 1996 AD || — || January 1, 1996 || Oizumi || T. Kobayashi || — || align=right | 2.7 km || 
|-id=404 bgcolor=#fefefe
| 100404 ||  || — || January 12, 1996 || Oizumi || T. Kobayashi || H || align=right | 1.3 km || 
|-id=405 bgcolor=#E9E9E9
| 100405 ||  || — || January 12, 1996 || Kitt Peak || Spacewatch || — || align=right | 2.2 km || 
|-id=406 bgcolor=#d6d6d6
| 100406 ||  || — || January 12, 1996 || Kitt Peak || Spacewatch || HYG || align=right | 6.1 km || 
|-id=407 bgcolor=#fefefe
| 100407 ||  || — || January 12, 1996 || Kitt Peak || Spacewatch || NYS || align=right | 1.3 km || 
|-id=408 bgcolor=#E9E9E9
| 100408 ||  || — || January 12, 1996 || Kitt Peak || Spacewatch || NEM || align=right | 4.6 km || 
|-id=409 bgcolor=#E9E9E9
| 100409 ||  || — || January 13, 1996 || Kitt Peak || Spacewatch || HEN || align=right | 1.8 km || 
|-id=410 bgcolor=#fefefe
| 100410 ||  || — || January 13, 1996 || Kitt Peak || Spacewatch || — || align=right | 1.6 km || 
|-id=411 bgcolor=#E9E9E9
| 100411 ||  || — || January 13, 1996 || Kitt Peak || Spacewatch || — || align=right | 1.5 km || 
|-id=412 bgcolor=#fefefe
| 100412 ||  || — || January 14, 1996 || Kitt Peak || Spacewatch || V || align=right | 1.1 km || 
|-id=413 bgcolor=#E9E9E9
| 100413 ||  || — || January 13, 1996 || Kitt Peak || Spacewatch || — || align=right | 3.7 km || 
|-id=414 bgcolor=#E9E9E9
| 100414 ||  || — || January 13, 1996 || Kitt Peak || Spacewatch || — || align=right | 4.1 km || 
|-id=415 bgcolor=#E9E9E9
| 100415 ||  || — || January 16, 1996 || Kitt Peak || Spacewatch || — || align=right | 2.6 km || 
|-id=416 bgcolor=#fefefe
| 100416 Syang || 1996 CB ||  || February 2, 1996 || NRC-DAO || D. D. Balam || H || align=right | 1.4 km || 
|-id=417 bgcolor=#E9E9E9
| 100417 Philipglass || 1996 EC ||  || March 7, 1996 || Linz || E. Meyer || — || align=right | 2.0 km || 
|-id=418 bgcolor=#E9E9E9
| 100418 ||  || — || March 12, 1996 || Kitt Peak || Spacewatch || — || align=right | 1.5 km || 
|-id=419 bgcolor=#fefefe
| 100419 ||  || — || March 12, 1996 || Kitt Peak || Spacewatch || NYS || align=right | 1.5 km || 
|-id=420 bgcolor=#E9E9E9
| 100420 ||  || — || March 12, 1996 || Kitt Peak || Spacewatch || AST || align=right | 4.2 km || 
|-id=421 bgcolor=#E9E9E9
| 100421 ||  || — || March 23, 1996 || Haleakala || AMOS || — || align=right | 5.1 km || 
|-id=422 bgcolor=#E9E9E9
| 100422 ||  || — || April 12, 1996 || Kitt Peak || Spacewatch || HOF || align=right | 5.4 km || 
|-id=423 bgcolor=#fefefe
| 100423 ||  || — || April 12, 1996 || Kitt Peak || Spacewatch || NYS || align=right | 1.3 km || 
|-id=424 bgcolor=#d6d6d6
| 100424 ||  || — || April 15, 1996 || La Silla || E. W. Elst || — || align=right | 5.8 km || 
|-id=425 bgcolor=#E9E9E9
| 100425 || 1996 HM || — || April 17, 1996 || Haleakala || AMOS || — || align=right | 2.1 km || 
|-id=426 bgcolor=#E9E9E9
| 100426 ||  || — || April 18, 1996 || Kitt Peak || Spacewatch || — || align=right | 1.9 km || 
|-id=427 bgcolor=#E9E9E9
| 100427 ||  || — || April 17, 1996 || La Silla || E. W. Elst || — || align=right | 4.4 km || 
|-id=428 bgcolor=#d6d6d6
| 100428 ||  || — || April 17, 1996 || La Silla || E. W. Elst || — || align=right | 5.4 km || 
|-id=429 bgcolor=#E9E9E9
| 100429 ||  || — || April 17, 1996 || La Silla || E. W. Elst || — || align=right | 5.5 km || 
|-id=430 bgcolor=#E9E9E9
| 100430 ||  || — || April 18, 1996 || La Silla || E. W. Elst || — || align=right | 2.7 km || 
|-id=431 bgcolor=#d6d6d6
| 100431 ||  || — || April 18, 1996 || La Silla || E. W. Elst || — || align=right | 5.7 km || 
|-id=432 bgcolor=#E9E9E9
| 100432 ||  || — || April 20, 1996 || La Silla || E. W. Elst || — || align=right | 1.8 km || 
|-id=433 bgcolor=#E9E9E9
| 100433 Hyakusyuko ||  ||  || May 24, 1996 || Nanyo || T. Okuni || — || align=right | 2.1 km || 
|-id=434 bgcolor=#E9E9E9
| 100434 Jinyilian || 1996 LJ ||  || June 6, 1996 || Xinglong || SCAP || — || align=right | 3.3 km || 
|-id=435 bgcolor=#E9E9E9
| 100435 ||  || — || June 8, 1996 || Kitt Peak || Spacewatch || — || align=right | 1.7 km || 
|-id=436 bgcolor=#fefefe
| 100436 ||  || — || July 15, 1996 || Haleakala || NEAT || — || align=right | 2.2 km || 
|-id=437 bgcolor=#E9E9E9
| 100437 || 1996 OY || — || July 22, 1996 || Kleť || Kleť Obs. || MAR || align=right | 1.8 km || 
|-id=438 bgcolor=#FA8072
| 100438 ||  || — || August 14, 1996 || Haleakala || NEAT || — || align=right | 5.7 km || 
|-id=439 bgcolor=#E9E9E9
| 100439 ||  || — || August 10, 1996 || Haleakala || NEAT || — || align=right | 3.1 km || 
|-id=440 bgcolor=#fefefe
| 100440 ||  || — || August 14, 1996 || Haleakala || NEAT || NYS || align=right | 1.3 km || 
|-id=441 bgcolor=#fefefe
| 100441 ||  || — || August 8, 1996 || La Silla || E. W. Elst || — || align=right | 1.2 km || 
|-id=442 bgcolor=#fefefe
| 100442 || 1996 QV || — || August 20, 1996 || Farra d'Isonzo || Farra d'Isonzo || NYS || align=right | 1.1 km || 
|-id=443 bgcolor=#E9E9E9
| 100443 || 1996 RS || — || September 9, 1996 || Haleakala || NEAT || — || align=right | 3.8 km || 
|-id=444 bgcolor=#E9E9E9
| 100444 ||  || — || September 9, 1996 || Prescott || P. G. Comba || — || align=right | 3.6 km || 
|-id=445 bgcolor=#fefefe
| 100445 Pisa ||  ||  || September 12, 1996 || Colleverde || V. S. Casulli || — || align=right | 1.4 km || 
|-id=446 bgcolor=#FA8072
| 100446 ||  || — || September 15, 1996 || Haleakala || NEAT || — || align=right data-sort-value="0.91" | 910 m || 
|-id=447 bgcolor=#fefefe
| 100447 ||  || — || September 14, 1996 || Church Stretton || S. P. Laurie || FLO || align=right | 1.2 km || 
|-id=448 bgcolor=#E9E9E9
| 100448 ||  || — || September 13, 1996 || Haleakala || NEAT || — || align=right | 2.5 km || 
|-id=449 bgcolor=#E9E9E9
| 100449 ||  || — || September 7, 1996 || Kitt Peak || Spacewatch || — || align=right | 6.0 km || 
|-id=450 bgcolor=#E9E9E9
| 100450 ||  || — || September 8, 1996 || Kitt Peak || Spacewatch || — || align=right | 3.0 km || 
|-id=451 bgcolor=#d6d6d6
| 100451 ||  || — || September 13, 1996 || Kitt Peak || Spacewatch || — || align=right | 3.1 km || 
|-id=452 bgcolor=#FA8072
| 100452 ||  || — || September 10, 1996 || La Silla || UDTS || — || align=right data-sort-value="0.84" | 840 m || 
|-id=453 bgcolor=#fefefe
| 100453 ||  || — || September 18, 1996 || Xinglong || SCAP || — || align=right | 1.5 km || 
|-id=454 bgcolor=#fefefe
| 100454 ||  || — || September 18, 1996 || Xinglong || SCAP || — || align=right | 1.6 km || 
|-id=455 bgcolor=#E9E9E9
| 100455 ||  || — || September 18, 1996 || Xinglong || SCAP || — || align=right | 2.3 km || 
|-id=456 bgcolor=#E9E9E9
| 100456 Chichén Itzá || 1996 TH ||  || October 2, 1996 || Colleverde || V. S. Casulli || — || align=right | 4.1 km || 
|-id=457 bgcolor=#d6d6d6
| 100457 ||  || — || October 7, 1996 || Prescott || P. G. Comba || — || align=right | 5.3 km || 
|-id=458 bgcolor=#fefefe
| 100458 ||  || — || October 4, 1996 || Church Stretton || S. P. Laurie || PHO || align=right | 2.2 km || 
|-id=459 bgcolor=#d6d6d6
| 100459 ||  || — || October 6, 1996 || Rand || G. R. Viscome || — || align=right | 5.8 km || 
|-id=460 bgcolor=#fefefe
| 100460 ||  || — || October 8, 1996 || Haleakala || NEAT || — || align=right | 1.7 km || 
|-id=461 bgcolor=#d6d6d6
| 100461 ||  || — || October 9, 1996 || Haleakala || NEAT || — || align=right | 6.9 km || 
|-id=462 bgcolor=#fefefe
| 100462 ||  || — || October 15, 1996 || Kleť || Kleť Obs. || FLO || align=right | 1.1 km || 
|-id=463 bgcolor=#E9E9E9
| 100463 ||  || — || October 9, 1996 || Nanyo || T. Okuni || — || align=right | 3.9 km || 
|-id=464 bgcolor=#d6d6d6
| 100464 ||  || — || October 3, 1996 || Xinglong || SCAP || HYG || align=right | 5.8 km || 
|-id=465 bgcolor=#d6d6d6
| 100465 ||  || — || October 4, 1996 || Kitt Peak || Spacewatch || — || align=right | 3.6 km || 
|-id=466 bgcolor=#d6d6d6
| 100466 ||  || — || October 4, 1996 || Kitt Peak || Spacewatch || — || align=right | 5.4 km || 
|-id=467 bgcolor=#fefefe
| 100467 ||  || — || October 4, 1996 || Kitt Peak || Spacewatch || — || align=right | 1.4 km || 
|-id=468 bgcolor=#fefefe
| 100468 ||  || — || October 6, 1996 || Kitt Peak || Spacewatch || FLO || align=right | 1.3 km || 
|-id=469 bgcolor=#E9E9E9
| 100469 ||  || — || October 7, 1996 || Kitt Peak || Spacewatch || DOR || align=right | 7.2 km || 
|-id=470 bgcolor=#fefefe
| 100470 ||  || — || October 7, 1996 || Kitt Peak || Spacewatch || — || align=right | 1.6 km || 
|-id=471 bgcolor=#fefefe
| 100471 ||  || — || October 7, 1996 || Kitt Peak || Spacewatch || MAS || align=right | 1.3 km || 
|-id=472 bgcolor=#E9E9E9
| 100472 ||  || — || October 10, 1996 || Kitt Peak || Spacewatch || — || align=right | 4.4 km || 
|-id=473 bgcolor=#fefefe
| 100473 ||  || — || October 10, 1996 || Kitt Peak || Spacewatch || NYS || align=right | 1.1 km || 
|-id=474 bgcolor=#E9E9E9
| 100474 ||  || — || October 11, 1996 || Kitt Peak || Spacewatch || — || align=right | 3.4 km || 
|-id=475 bgcolor=#C2FFFF
| 100475 ||  || — || October 12, 1996 || Kitt Peak || Spacewatch || L4 || align=right | 16 km || 
|-id=476 bgcolor=#d6d6d6
| 100476 ||  || — || October 12, 1996 || Kitt Peak || Spacewatch || — || align=right | 6.3 km || 
|-id=477 bgcolor=#fefefe
| 100477 ||  || — || October 8, 1996 || La Silla || E. W. Elst || FLO || align=right | 1.2 km || 
|-id=478 bgcolor=#E9E9E9
| 100478 ||  || — || October 3, 1996 || La Silla || E. W. Elst || — || align=right | 7.5 km || 
|-id=479 bgcolor=#E9E9E9
| 100479 ||  || — || October 3, 1996 || La Silla || E. W. Elst || — || align=right | 6.1 km || 
|-id=480 bgcolor=#FA8072
| 100480 || 1996 UK || — || October 16, 1996 || Nachi-Katsuura || Y. Shimizu, T. Urata || — || align=right | 2.5 km || 
|-id=481 bgcolor=#fefefe
| 100481 ||  || — || October 20, 1996 || Oizumi || T. Kobayashi || — || align=right | 1.4 km || 
|-id=482 bgcolor=#E9E9E9
| 100482 ||  || — || October 18, 1996 || Kitt Peak || Spacewatch || — || align=right | 4.6 km || 
|-id=483 bgcolor=#E9E9E9
| 100483 NAOJ ||  ||  || October 30, 1996 || Tokyo-Mitaka || I. Satō, H. Fukushima, N. Yamamoto || — || align=right | 4.2 km || 
|-id=484 bgcolor=#d6d6d6
| 100484 ||  || — || October 29, 1996 || Xinglong || SCAP || — || align=right | 4.7 km || 
|-id=485 bgcolor=#FA8072
| 100485 Russelldavies || 1996 VX ||  || November 3, 1996 || Linz || E. Meyer, E. Obermair || — || align=right | 1.7 km || 
|-id=486 bgcolor=#d6d6d6
| 100486 ||  || — || November 7, 1996 || Prescott || P. G. Comba || — || align=right | 7.1 km || 
|-id=487 bgcolor=#fefefe
| 100487 ||  || — || November 10, 1996 || Sudbury || D. di Cicco || FLO || align=right | 1.3 km || 
|-id=488 bgcolor=#E9E9E9
| 100488 ||  || — || November 4, 1996 || Kitt Peak || Spacewatch || — || align=right | 3.6 km || 
|-id=489 bgcolor=#fefefe
| 100489 ||  || — || November 5, 1996 || Kitt Peak || Spacewatch || NYS || align=right | 1.1 km || 
|-id=490 bgcolor=#d6d6d6
| 100490 ||  || — || November 5, 1996 || Kitt Peak || Spacewatch || — || align=right | 3.4 km || 
|-id=491 bgcolor=#fefefe
| 100491 ||  || — || November 3, 1996 || Kitt Peak || Spacewatch || — || align=right | 1.00 km || 
|-id=492 bgcolor=#fefefe
| 100492 ||  || — || November 7, 1996 || Kitt Peak || Spacewatch || — || align=right | 1.4 km || 
|-id=493 bgcolor=#FA8072
| 100493 ||  || — || November 11, 1996 || Kitt Peak || Spacewatch || fast? || align=right | 1.1 km || 
|-id=494 bgcolor=#E9E9E9
| 100494 ||  || — || November 9, 1996 || Xinglong || SCAP || — || align=right | 6.0 km || 
|-id=495 bgcolor=#d6d6d6
| 100495 || 1996 WH || — || November 17, 1996 || Sudbury || D. di Cicco || — || align=right | 7.4 km || 
|-id=496 bgcolor=#fefefe
| 100496 || 1996 WJ || — || November 17, 1996 || Sudbury || D. di Cicco || — || align=right | 2.8 km || 
|-id=497 bgcolor=#d6d6d6
| 100497 || 1996 XB || — || December 1, 1996 || Prescott || P. G. Comba || — || align=right | 5.2 km || 
|-id=498 bgcolor=#fefefe
| 100498 || 1996 XK || — || December 1, 1996 || Kitt Peak || Spacewatch || — || align=right | 2.0 km || 
|-id=499 bgcolor=#fefefe
| 100499 || 1996 XP || — || December 1, 1996 || Chichibu || N. Satō || MAS || align=right | 1.4 km || 
|-id=500 bgcolor=#fefefe
| 100500 ||  || — || December 4, 1996 || Kitt Peak || Spacewatch || NYS || align=right | 1.0 km || 
|}

100501–100600 

|-bgcolor=#fefefe
| 100501 ||  || — || December 8, 1996 || Bisei SG Center || BATTeRS || — || align=right | 2.3 km || 
|-id=502 bgcolor=#fefefe
| 100502 ||  || — || December 12, 1996 || Kitt Peak || Spacewatch || V || align=right data-sort-value="0.96" | 960 m || 
|-id=503 bgcolor=#fefefe
| 100503 ||  || — || December 9, 1996 || Kitt Peak || Spacewatch || NYS || align=right | 1.3 km || 
|-id=504 bgcolor=#fefefe
| 100504 ||  || — || January 2, 1997 || Kitt Peak || Spacewatch || MAS || align=right | 1.0 km || 
|-id=505 bgcolor=#d6d6d6
| 100505 ||  || — || January 2, 1997 || Kitt Peak || Spacewatch || — || align=right | 6.5 km || 
|-id=506 bgcolor=#d6d6d6
| 100506 ||  || — || January 2, 1997 || Kitt Peak || Spacewatch || — || align=right | 4.3 km || 
|-id=507 bgcolor=#fefefe
| 100507 ||  || — || January 10, 1997 || Kitt Peak || Spacewatch || NYS || align=right data-sort-value="0.99" | 990 m || 
|-id=508 bgcolor=#d6d6d6
| 100508 ||  || — || January 13, 1997 || Kleť || Kleť Obs. || ALA || align=right | 7.8 km || 
|-id=509 bgcolor=#fefefe
| 100509 ||  || — || January 11, 1997 || Haleakala || NEAT || PHO || align=right | 2.5 km || 
|-id=510 bgcolor=#fefefe
| 100510 ||  || — || January 15, 1997 || Farra d'Isonzo || Farra d'Isonzo || FLO || align=right | 1.3 km || 
|-id=511 bgcolor=#d6d6d6
| 100511 ||  || — || January 10, 1997 || Kitt Peak || Spacewatch || EOS || align=right | 3.4 km || 
|-id=512 bgcolor=#d6d6d6
| 100512 ||  || — || January 11, 1997 || Kitt Peak || Spacewatch || — || align=right | 3.2 km || 
|-id=513 bgcolor=#fefefe
| 100513 ||  || — || January 10, 1997 || Uenohara || N. Kawasato || V || align=right | 1.6 km || 
|-id=514 bgcolor=#fefefe
| 100514 ||  || — || January 15, 1997 || Campo Imperatore || A. Boattini, A. Di Paola || NYS || align=right | 1.1 km || 
|-id=515 bgcolor=#d6d6d6
| 100515 ||  || — || January 15, 1997 || Campo Imperatore || A. Boattini, A. Di Paola || — || align=right | 4.9 km || 
|-id=516 bgcolor=#E9E9E9
| 100516 || 1997 BA || — || January 16, 1997 || Oizumi || T. Kobayashi || MIT || align=right | 4.9 km || 
|-id=517 bgcolor=#d6d6d6
| 100517 || 1997 BD || — || January 16, 1997 || Kleť || Kleť Obs. || — || align=right | 4.9 km || 
|-id=518 bgcolor=#E9E9E9
| 100518 || 1997 BL || — || January 16, 1997 || Oizumi || T. Kobayashi || — || align=right | 2.7 km || 
|-id=519 bgcolor=#E9E9E9
| 100519 Bombig ||  ||  || January 28, 1997 || Farra d'Isonzo || Farra d'Isonzo || — || align=right | 1.7 km || 
|-id=520 bgcolor=#E9E9E9
| 100520 ||  || — || January 30, 1997 || Oizumi || T. Kobayashi || — || align=right | 2.2 km || 
|-id=521 bgcolor=#d6d6d6
| 100521 ||  || — || January 26, 1997 || Modra || A. Galád, A. Pravda || — || align=right | 5.8 km || 
|-id=522 bgcolor=#d6d6d6
| 100522 || 1997 CA || — || February 1, 1997 || Ondřejov || L. Kotková || — || align=right | 6.3 km || 
|-id=523 bgcolor=#E9E9E9
| 100523 ||  || — || February 2, 1997 || Kitt Peak || Spacewatch || — || align=right | 1.4 km || 
|-id=524 bgcolor=#E9E9E9
| 100524 ||  || — || February 6, 1997 || Kleť || Kleť Obs. || — || align=right | 3.3 km || 
|-id=525 bgcolor=#d6d6d6
| 100525 ||  || — || February 1, 1997 || Kitt Peak || Spacewatch || ALA || align=right | 7.3 km || 
|-id=526 bgcolor=#fefefe
| 100526 ||  || — || February 1, 1997 || Kitt Peak || Spacewatch || — || align=right | 1.8 km || 
|-id=527 bgcolor=#fefefe
| 100527 ||  || — || February 2, 1997 || Kitt Peak || Spacewatch || MAS || align=right | 1.1 km || 
|-id=528 bgcolor=#d6d6d6
| 100528 ||  || — || February 3, 1997 || Kitt Peak || Spacewatch || — || align=right | 4.2 km || 
|-id=529 bgcolor=#fefefe
| 100529 ||  || — || February 3, 1997 || Kitt Peak || Spacewatch || — || align=right | 1.5 km || 
|-id=530 bgcolor=#fefefe
| 100530 ||  || — || February 3, 1997 || Kitt Peak || Spacewatch || — || align=right | 3.4 km || 
|-id=531 bgcolor=#fefefe
| 100531 ||  || — || February 3, 1997 || Kitt Peak || Spacewatch || MAS || align=right | 1.3 km || 
|-id=532 bgcolor=#E9E9E9
| 100532 ||  || — || February 6, 1997 || Oizumi || T. Kobayashi || — || align=right | 2.9 km || 
|-id=533 bgcolor=#fefefe
| 100533 ||  || — || February 1, 1997 || Kitt Peak || Spacewatch || — || align=right | 1.4 km || 
|-id=534 bgcolor=#fefefe
| 100534 ||  || — || February 3, 1997 || Kitt Peak || Spacewatch || — || align=right | 3.2 km || 
|-id=535 bgcolor=#fefefe
| 100535 ||  || — || February 3, 1997 || Kitt Peak || Spacewatch || — || align=right | 1.7 km || 
|-id=536 bgcolor=#E9E9E9
| 100536 ||  || — || February 6, 1997 || Xinglong || SCAP || — || align=right | 3.1 km || 
|-id=537 bgcolor=#d6d6d6
| 100537 ||  || — || March 2, 1997 || Kitt Peak || Spacewatch || THM || align=right | 4.8 km || 
|-id=538 bgcolor=#d6d6d6
| 100538 ||  || — || March 7, 1997 || Kitt Peak || Spacewatch || — || align=right | 4.5 km || 
|-id=539 bgcolor=#d6d6d6
| 100539 ||  || — || March 3, 1997 || Kitt Peak || Spacewatch || — || align=right | 3.1 km || 
|-id=540 bgcolor=#fefefe
| 100540 ||  || — || March 4, 1997 || Kitt Peak || Spacewatch || — || align=right | 1.8 km || 
|-id=541 bgcolor=#fefefe
| 100541 ||  || — || March 7, 1997 || Kitt Peak || Spacewatch || V || align=right | 1.4 km || 
|-id=542 bgcolor=#E9E9E9
| 100542 ||  || — || March 9, 1997 || Oohira || T. Urata || — || align=right | 2.6 km || 
|-id=543 bgcolor=#d6d6d6
| 100543 ||  || — || March 4, 1997 || Kitt Peak || Spacewatch || THM || align=right | 3.8 km || 
|-id=544 bgcolor=#fefefe
| 100544 ||  || — || March 10, 1997 || Kitt Peak || Spacewatch || NYS || align=right | 1.1 km || 
|-id=545 bgcolor=#E9E9E9
| 100545 ||  || — || March 9, 1997 || Kitt Peak || Spacewatch || JUN || align=right | 2.6 km || 
|-id=546 bgcolor=#fefefe
| 100546 ||  || — || March 13, 1997 || Bédoin || P. Antonini || — || align=right | 1.9 km || 
|-id=547 bgcolor=#fefefe
| 100547 ||  || — || March 4, 1997 || Socorro || LINEAR || — || align=right | 3.1 km || 
|-id=548 bgcolor=#E9E9E9
| 100548 ||  || — || March 4, 1997 || Socorro || LINEAR || — || align=right | 2.7 km || 
|-id=549 bgcolor=#d6d6d6
| 100549 ||  || — || March 5, 1997 || Socorro || LINEAR || THM || align=right | 5.5 km || 
|-id=550 bgcolor=#E9E9E9
| 100550 ||  || — || March 10, 1997 || Socorro || LINEAR || — || align=right | 4.3 km || 
|-id=551 bgcolor=#d6d6d6
| 100551 ||  || — || March 10, 1997 || Socorro || LINEAR || — || align=right | 4.6 km || 
|-id=552 bgcolor=#E9E9E9
| 100552 ||  || — || March 31, 1997 || Socorro || LINEAR || — || align=right | 5.0 km || 
|-id=553 bgcolor=#FA8072
| 100553 Dariofo || 1997 GD ||  || April 2, 1997 || Pianoro || V. Goretti || — || align=right | 1.4 km || 
|-id=554 bgcolor=#E9E9E9
| 100554 || 1997 GJ || — || April 4, 1997 || Haleakala || NEAT || — || align=right | 2.0 km || 
|-id=555 bgcolor=#fefefe
| 100555 ||  || — || April 7, 1997 || Kitt Peak || Spacewatch || — || align=right | 3.5 km || 
|-id=556 bgcolor=#E9E9E9
| 100556 ||  || — || April 7, 1997 || Kitt Peak || Spacewatch || — || align=right | 3.5 km || 
|-id=557 bgcolor=#fefefe
| 100557 ||  || — || April 3, 1997 || Kitami || K. Endate, K. Watanabe || — || align=right | 1.8 km || 
|-id=558 bgcolor=#fefefe
| 100558 ||  || — || April 3, 1997 || Socorro || LINEAR || NYS || align=right | 3.4 km || 
|-id=559 bgcolor=#E9E9E9
| 100559 ||  || — || April 3, 1997 || Socorro || LINEAR || — || align=right | 2.1 km || 
|-id=560 bgcolor=#E9E9E9
| 100560 ||  || — || April 3, 1997 || Socorro || LINEAR || — || align=right | 2.6 km || 
|-id=561 bgcolor=#E9E9E9
| 100561 ||  || — || April 3, 1997 || Socorro || LINEAR || HEN || align=right | 2.0 km || 
|-id=562 bgcolor=#fefefe
| 100562 ||  || — || April 5, 1997 || Socorro || LINEAR || NYS || align=right | 1.3 km || 
|-id=563 bgcolor=#fefefe
| 100563 ||  || — || April 7, 1997 || Kitt Peak || Spacewatch || — || align=right | 1.4 km || 
|-id=564 bgcolor=#d6d6d6
| 100564 ||  || — || April 9, 1997 || Prescott || P. G. Comba || — || align=right | 6.4 km || 
|-id=565 bgcolor=#E9E9E9
| 100565 ||  || — || April 9, 1997 || Kitt Peak || Spacewatch || — || align=right | 1.5 km || 
|-id=566 bgcolor=#E9E9E9
| 100566 ||  || — || April 3, 1997 || Socorro || LINEAR || — || align=right | 2.5 km || 
|-id=567 bgcolor=#fefefe
| 100567 ||  || — || April 6, 1997 || Socorro || LINEAR || — || align=right | 1.5 km || 
|-id=568 bgcolor=#fefefe
| 100568 ||  || — || April 5, 1997 || Haleakala || NEAT || NYS || align=right | 1.2 km || 
|-id=569 bgcolor=#E9E9E9
| 100569 || 1997 HR || — || April 28, 1997 || Kitt Peak || Spacewatch || — || align=right | 2.2 km || 
|-id=570 bgcolor=#E9E9E9
| 100570 ||  || — || April 28, 1997 || Kitt Peak || Spacewatch || — || align=right | 1.8 km || 
|-id=571 bgcolor=#fefefe
| 100571 ||  || — || April 29, 1997 || Kitt Peak || Spacewatch || NYS || align=right data-sort-value="0.99" | 990 m || 
|-id=572 bgcolor=#E9E9E9
| 100572 ||  || — || April 29, 1997 || Kitt Peak || Spacewatch || — || align=right | 2.8 km || 
|-id=573 bgcolor=#fefefe
| 100573 ||  || — || April 29, 1997 || Kitt Peak || Spacewatch || — || align=right | 1.2 km || 
|-id=574 bgcolor=#fefefe
| 100574 ||  || — || April 30, 1997 || Kitt Peak || Spacewatch || NYS || align=right | 1.4 km || 
|-id=575 bgcolor=#fefefe
| 100575 ||  || — || April 30, 1997 || Kitt Peak || Spacewatch || — || align=right data-sort-value="0.85" | 850 m || 
|-id=576 bgcolor=#fefefe
| 100576 ||  || — || April 30, 1997 || Socorro || LINEAR || — || align=right | 1.7 km || 
|-id=577 bgcolor=#fefefe
| 100577 ||  || — || April 30, 1997 || Socorro || LINEAR || — || align=right | 1.4 km || 
|-id=578 bgcolor=#E9E9E9
| 100578 ||  || — || April 30, 1997 || Socorro || LINEAR || — || align=right | 3.3 km || 
|-id=579 bgcolor=#E9E9E9
| 100579 ||  || — || April 30, 1997 || Socorro || LINEAR || EUN || align=right | 1.9 km || 
|-id=580 bgcolor=#fefefe
| 100580 ||  || — || April 30, 1997 || Kitt Peak || Spacewatch || MAS || align=right | 1.2 km || 
|-id=581 bgcolor=#E9E9E9
| 100581 ||  || — || April 29, 1997 || Kitt Peak || Spacewatch || — || align=right | 2.8 km || 
|-id=582 bgcolor=#E9E9E9
| 100582 ||  || — || April 30, 1997 || Kitt Peak || Spacewatch || — || align=right | 1.8 km || 
|-id=583 bgcolor=#fefefe
| 100583 ||  || — || May 10, 1997 || Mauna Kea || C. Veillet || — || align=right | 3.5 km || 
|-id=584 bgcolor=#fefefe
| 100584 ||  || — || May 1, 1997 || Socorro || LINEAR || NYS || align=right | 1.3 km || 
|-id=585 bgcolor=#E9E9E9
| 100585 ||  || — || June 7, 1997 || La Silla || E. W. Elst || — || align=right | 2.2 km || 
|-id=586 bgcolor=#fefefe
| 100586 ||  || — || June 8, 1997 || La Silla || E. W. Elst || NYS || align=right | 1.4 km || 
|-id=587 bgcolor=#fefefe
| 100587 || 1997 MH || — || June 26, 1997 || Kitt Peak || Spacewatch || V || align=right | 1.3 km || 
|-id=588 bgcolor=#E9E9E9
| 100588 ||  || — || June 28, 1997 || Socorro || LINEAR || — || align=right | 2.4 km || 
|-id=589 bgcolor=#E9E9E9
| 100589 ||  || — || June 29, 1997 || Kitt Peak || Spacewatch || — || align=right | 2.1 km || 
|-id=590 bgcolor=#E9E9E9
| 100590 ||  || — || July 2, 1997 || Kitt Peak || Spacewatch || PAL || align=right | 4.4 km || 
|-id=591 bgcolor=#d6d6d6
| 100591 ||  || — || July 2, 1997 || Kitt Peak || Spacewatch || — || align=right | 4.4 km || 
|-id=592 bgcolor=#fefefe
| 100592 ||  || — || July 5, 1997 || Kitt Peak || Spacewatch || — || align=right | 3.6 km || 
|-id=593 bgcolor=#fefefe
| 100593 ||  || — || July 28, 1997 || Kitt Peak || Spacewatch || MAS || align=right | 1.8 km || 
|-id=594 bgcolor=#fefefe
| 100594 ||  || — || July 30, 1997 || Caussols || ODAS || NYS || align=right | 1.3 km || 
|-id=595 bgcolor=#d6d6d6
| 100595 ||  || — || August 4, 1997 || Modra || A. Galád, A. Pravda || KOR || align=right | 2.4 km || 
|-id=596 bgcolor=#d6d6d6
| 100596 Perrett ||  ||  || August 9, 1997 || NRC-DAO || D. D. Balam || — || align=right | 3.9 km || 
|-id=597 bgcolor=#E9E9E9
| 100597 ||  || — || August 11, 1997 || Xinglong || SCAP || — || align=right | 1.6 km || 
|-id=598 bgcolor=#fefefe
| 100598 ||  || — || August 31, 1997 || Cloudcroft || W. Offutt || H || align=right | 1.9 km || 
|-id=599 bgcolor=#fefefe
| 100599 ||  || — || August 31, 1997 || Bergisch Gladbach || W. Bickel || — || align=right | 1.1 km || 
|-id=600 bgcolor=#d6d6d6
| 100600 Davidfossé ||  ||  || September 4, 1997 || Caussols || ODAS || — || align=right | 5.3 km || 
|}

100601–100700 

|-bgcolor=#d6d6d6
| 100601 ||  || — || September 4, 1997 || Caussols || ODAS || — || align=right | 3.9 km || 
|-id=602 bgcolor=#d6d6d6
| 100602 ||  || — || September 10, 1997 || Bergisch Gladbach || W. Bickel || — || align=right | 3.7 km || 
|-id=603 bgcolor=#E9E9E9
| 100603 ||  || — || September 15, 1997 || Modra || A. Galád, A. Pravda || — || align=right | 2.1 km || 
|-id=604 bgcolor=#E9E9E9
| 100604 Lundy ||  ||  || September 11, 1997 || Uccle || T. Pauwels || — || align=right | 2.0 km || 
|-id=605 bgcolor=#E9E9E9
| 100605 ||  || — || September 23, 1997 || Farra d'Isonzo || Farra d'Isonzo || — || align=right | 1.8 km || 
|-id=606 bgcolor=#E9E9E9
| 100606 ||  || — || September 25, 1997 || Ondřejov || P. Pravec || EUN || align=right | 3.3 km || 
|-id=607 bgcolor=#E9E9E9
| 100607 ||  || — || September 26, 1997 || Ondřejov || P. Pravec || — || align=right | 2.1 km || 
|-id=608 bgcolor=#E9E9E9
| 100608 ||  || — || September 23, 1997 || Kitt Peak || Spacewatch || — || align=right | 2.2 km || 
|-id=609 bgcolor=#d6d6d6
| 100609 ||  || — || September 23, 1997 || Kitt Peak || Spacewatch || EOS || align=right | 3.3 km || 
|-id=610 bgcolor=#E9E9E9
| 100610 ||  || — || September 28, 1997 || Kitt Peak || Spacewatch || — || align=right | 3.4 km || 
|-id=611 bgcolor=#d6d6d6
| 100611 ||  || — || September 28, 1997 || Kitt Peak || Spacewatch || — || align=right | 3.8 km || 
|-id=612 bgcolor=#E9E9E9
| 100612 ||  || — || September 29, 1997 || Nachi-Katsuura || Y. Shimizu, T. Urata || — || align=right | 2.8 km || 
|-id=613 bgcolor=#E9E9E9
| 100613 ||  || — || September 28, 1997 || Kitt Peak || Spacewatch || — || align=right | 1.3 km || 
|-id=614 bgcolor=#E9E9E9
| 100614 ||  || — || September 28, 1997 || Haleakala || NEAT || — || align=right | 2.6 km || 
|-id=615 bgcolor=#fefefe
| 100615 ||  || — || October 3, 1997 || Caussols || ODAS || — || align=right | 2.2 km || 
|-id=616 bgcolor=#E9E9E9
| 100616 ||  || — || October 3, 1997 || Caussols || ODAS || EUN || align=right | 1.9 km || 
|-id=617 bgcolor=#d6d6d6
| 100617 ||  || — || October 3, 1997 || Caussols || ODAS || HYG || align=right | 5.8 km || 
|-id=618 bgcolor=#E9E9E9
| 100618 ||  || — || October 3, 1997 || Kitt Peak || Spacewatch || — || align=right | 3.9 km || 
|-id=619 bgcolor=#C2FFFF
| 100619 ||  || — || October 4, 1997 || Kitt Peak || Spacewatch || L4 || align=right | 17 km || 
|-id=620 bgcolor=#d6d6d6
| 100620 ||  || — || October 3, 1997 || Kitt Peak || Spacewatch || URS || align=right | 5.6 km || 
|-id=621 bgcolor=#d6d6d6
| 100621 ||  || — || October 11, 1997 || Kitt Peak || Spacewatch || — || align=right | 5.2 km || 
|-id=622 bgcolor=#E9E9E9
| 100622 ||  || — || October 13, 1997 || Xinglong || SCAP || — || align=right | 1.8 km || 
|-id=623 bgcolor=#d6d6d6
| 100623 ||  || — || October 3, 1997 || Kitt Peak || Spacewatch || HYG || align=right | 5.6 km || 
|-id=624 bgcolor=#C2FFFF
| 100624 ||  || — || October 6, 1997 || La Silla || UDTS || L4 || align=right | 16 km || 
|-id=625 bgcolor=#E9E9E9
| 100625 || 1997 UZ || — || October 22, 1997 || Kleť || Kleť Obs. || AGN || align=right | 2.7 km || 
|-id=626 bgcolor=#E9E9E9
| 100626 ||  || — || October 21, 1997 || Nachi-Katsuura || Y. Shimizu, T. Urata || — || align=right | 4.6 km || 
|-id=627 bgcolor=#E9E9E9
| 100627 ||  || — || October 19, 1997 || Farra d'Isonzo || Farra d'Isonzo || — || align=right | 4.6 km || 
|-id=628 bgcolor=#E9E9E9
| 100628 ||  || — || October 26, 1997 || Oizumi || T. Kobayashi || — || align=right | 1.6 km || 
|-id=629 bgcolor=#fefefe
| 100629 ||  || — || October 21, 1997 || Kitt Peak || Spacewatch || — || align=right | 1.9 km || 
|-id=630 bgcolor=#fefefe
| 100630 ||  || — || October 22, 1997 || Ondřejov || P. Pravec || V || align=right | 1.2 km || 
|-id=631 bgcolor=#d6d6d6
| 100631 ||  || — || October 29, 1997 || Prescott || P. G. Comba || — || align=right | 4.1 km || 
|-id=632 bgcolor=#d6d6d6
| 100632 ||  || — || October 23, 1997 || Kitt Peak || Spacewatch || — || align=right | 3.7 km || 
|-id=633 bgcolor=#d6d6d6
| 100633 ||  || — || October 23, 1997 || Kitt Peak || Spacewatch || — || align=right | 4.3 km || 
|-id=634 bgcolor=#fefefe
| 100634 ||  || — || October 30, 1997 || Anderson Mesa || B. A. Skiff || — || align=right | 1.0 km || 
|-id=635 bgcolor=#E9E9E9
| 100635 ||  || — || October 30, 1997 || Bergisch Gladbach || W. Bickel || — || align=right | 1.8 km || 
|-id=636 bgcolor=#fefefe
| 100636 ||  || — || October 26, 1997 || La Silla || UDTS || — || align=right | 2.3 km || 
|-id=637 bgcolor=#E9E9E9
| 100637 ||  || — || November 1, 1997 || Kitami || K. Endate, K. Watanabe || EUN || align=right | 2.6 km || 
|-id=638 bgcolor=#d6d6d6
| 100638 ||  || — || November 1, 1997 || Xinglong || SCAP || — || align=right | 6.2 km || 
|-id=639 bgcolor=#E9E9E9
| 100639 ||  || — || November 6, 1997 || Oizumi || T. Kobayashi || EUN || align=right | 2.8 km || 
|-id=640 bgcolor=#fefefe
| 100640 ||  || — || November 7, 1997 || Zeno || T. Stafford || KLI || align=right | 6.0 km || 
|-id=641 bgcolor=#E9E9E9
| 100641 ||  || — || November 3, 1997 || Sormano || V. Giuliani, F. Manca || BRU || align=right | 3.7 km || 
|-id=642 bgcolor=#E9E9E9
| 100642 ||  || — || November 4, 1997 || Nachi-Katsuura || Y. Shimizu, T. Urata || — || align=right | 2.5 km || 
|-id=643 bgcolor=#E9E9E9
| 100643 ||  || — || November 9, 1997 || Oizumi || T. Kobayashi || — || align=right | 3.0 km || 
|-id=644 bgcolor=#E9E9E9
| 100644 ||  || — || November 1, 1997 || Kitami || K. Endate, K. Watanabe || RAF || align=right | 4.7 km || 
|-id=645 bgcolor=#E9E9E9
| 100645 ||  || — || November 3, 1997 || Xinglong || SCAP || — || align=right | 2.2 km || 
|-id=646 bgcolor=#E9E9E9
| 100646 || 1997 WR || — || November 19, 1997 || Oizumi || T. Kobayashi || — || align=right | 3.6 km || 
|-id=647 bgcolor=#fefefe
| 100647 ||  || — || November 23, 1997 || Oizumi || T. Kobayashi || — || align=right | 1.4 km || 
|-id=648 bgcolor=#fefefe
| 100648 ||  || — || November 23, 1997 || Oizumi || T. Kobayashi || — || align=right | 1.6 km || 
|-id=649 bgcolor=#E9E9E9
| 100649 ||  || — || November 20, 1997 || Kitt Peak || Spacewatch || — || align=right | 2.0 km || 
|-id=650 bgcolor=#E9E9E9
| 100650 ||  || — || November 20, 1997 || Kitt Peak || Spacewatch || — || align=right | 2.8 km || 
|-id=651 bgcolor=#E9E9E9
| 100651 ||  || — || November 22, 1997 || Kitt Peak || Spacewatch || — || align=right | 2.2 km || 
|-id=652 bgcolor=#E9E9E9
| 100652 ||  || — || November 22, 1997 || Kitt Peak || Spacewatch || — || align=right | 2.1 km || 
|-id=653 bgcolor=#E9E9E9
| 100653 ||  || — || November 22, 1997 || Kitt Peak || Spacewatch || — || align=right | 1.8 km || 
|-id=654 bgcolor=#E9E9E9
| 100654 ||  || — || November 23, 1997 || Kitt Peak || Spacewatch || — || align=right | 1.8 km || 
|-id=655 bgcolor=#d6d6d6
| 100655 ||  || — || November 22, 1997 || Kitt Peak || Spacewatch || — || align=right | 4.1 km || 
|-id=656 bgcolor=#E9E9E9
| 100656 ||  || — || November 23, 1997 || Kitt Peak || Spacewatch || — || align=right | 2.2 km || 
|-id=657 bgcolor=#E9E9E9
| 100657 ||  || — || November 23, 1997 || Kitt Peak || Spacewatch || — || align=right | 2.0 km || 
|-id=658 bgcolor=#E9E9E9
| 100658 ||  || — || November 25, 1997 || Kitt Peak || Spacewatch || — || align=right | 4.1 km || 
|-id=659 bgcolor=#E9E9E9
| 100659 ||  || — || November 25, 1997 || Kitt Peak || Spacewatch || — || align=right | 2.0 km || 
|-id=660 bgcolor=#E9E9E9
| 100660 ||  || — || November 30, 1997 || Oizumi || T. Kobayashi || — || align=right | 3.8 km || 
|-id=661 bgcolor=#E9E9E9
| 100661 ||  || — || November 28, 1997 || Kitt Peak || Spacewatch || — || align=right | 2.3 km || 
|-id=662 bgcolor=#E9E9E9
| 100662 ||  || — || November 29, 1997 || Kitt Peak || Spacewatch || — || align=right | 3.7 km || 
|-id=663 bgcolor=#d6d6d6
| 100663 ||  || — || November 29, 1997 || Socorro || LINEAR || HYG || align=right | 5.5 km || 
|-id=664 bgcolor=#E9E9E9
| 100664 ||  || — || November 29, 1997 || Socorro || LINEAR || — || align=right | 3.9 km || 
|-id=665 bgcolor=#E9E9E9
| 100665 ||  || — || November 29, 1997 || Socorro || LINEAR || — || align=right | 2.4 km || 
|-id=666 bgcolor=#fefefe
| 100666 ||  || — || November 29, 1997 || Socorro || LINEAR || NYS || align=right | 2.1 km || 
|-id=667 bgcolor=#fefefe
| 100667 ||  || — || November 29, 1997 || Socorro || LINEAR || MAS || align=right | 1.6 km || 
|-id=668 bgcolor=#fefefe
| 100668 ||  || — || November 29, 1997 || Socorro || LINEAR || — || align=right | 1.5 km || 
|-id=669 bgcolor=#E9E9E9
| 100669 ||  || — || November 28, 1997 || Xinglong || SCAP || — || align=right | 2.0 km || 
|-id=670 bgcolor=#E9E9E9
| 100670 ||  || — || November 29, 1997 || Socorro || LINEAR || — || align=right | 3.3 km || 
|-id=671 bgcolor=#E9E9E9
| 100671 ||  || — || November 26, 1997 || La Silla || UDTS || — || align=right | 3.0 km || 
|-id=672 bgcolor=#E9E9E9
| 100672 ||  || — || November 30, 1997 || La Silla || UDTS || — || align=right | 1.6 km || 
|-id=673 bgcolor=#E9E9E9
| 100673 || 1997 XY || — || December 3, 1997 || Oizumi || T. Kobayashi || — || align=right | 2.1 km || 
|-id=674 bgcolor=#E9E9E9
| 100674 ||  || — || December 2, 1997 || Nachi-Katsuura || Y. Shimizu, T. Urata || — || align=right | 4.0 km || 
|-id=675 bgcolor=#E9E9E9
| 100675 Chuyanakahara ||  ||  || December 4, 1997 || Kuma Kogen || A. Nakamura || — || align=right | 4.2 km || 
|-id=676 bgcolor=#E9E9E9
| 100676 ||  || — || December 6, 1997 || Farra d'Isonzo || Farra d'Isonzo || — || align=right | 1.7 km || 
|-id=677 bgcolor=#E9E9E9
| 100677 ||  || — || December 5, 1997 || Caussols || ODAS || — || align=right | 2.9 km || 
|-id=678 bgcolor=#E9E9E9
| 100678 ||  || — || December 4, 1997 || Xinglong || SCAP || — || align=right | 3.0 km || 
|-id=679 bgcolor=#fefefe
| 100679 ||  || — || December 15, 1997 || Xinglong || SCAP || — || align=right | 1.5 km || 
|-id=680 bgcolor=#E9E9E9
| 100680 ||  || — || December 15, 1997 || Xinglong || SCAP || — || align=right | 2.5 km || 
|-id=681 bgcolor=#FA8072
| 100681 ||  || — || December 19, 1997 || Xinglong || SCAP || — || align=right | 2.4 km || 
|-id=682 bgcolor=#E9E9E9
| 100682 ||  || — || December 19, 1997 || Xinglong || SCAP || — || align=right | 5.1 km || 
|-id=683 bgcolor=#d6d6d6
| 100683 ||  || — || December 20, 1997 || Xinglong || SCAP || — || align=right | 7.5 km || 
|-id=684 bgcolor=#E9E9E9
| 100684 ||  || — || December 21, 1997 || Xinglong || SCAP || — || align=right | 5.2 km || 
|-id=685 bgcolor=#fefefe
| 100685 ||  || — || December 21, 1997 || Oizumi || T. Kobayashi || — || align=right | 1.3 km || 
|-id=686 bgcolor=#E9E9E9
| 100686 ||  || — || December 24, 1997 || Oizumi || T. Kobayashi || ADE || align=right | 3.5 km || 
|-id=687 bgcolor=#E9E9E9
| 100687 ||  || — || December 23, 1997 || Xinglong || SCAP || HEN || align=right | 2.6 km || 
|-id=688 bgcolor=#E9E9E9
| 100688 ||  || — || December 25, 1997 || Oizumi || T. Kobayashi || — || align=right | 3.8 km || 
|-id=689 bgcolor=#E9E9E9
| 100689 ||  || — || December 25, 1997 || Chichibu || N. Satō || — || align=right | 4.1 km || 
|-id=690 bgcolor=#E9E9E9
| 100690 ||  || — || December 25, 1997 || Stakenbridge || B. G. W. Manning || — || align=right | 1.1 km || 
|-id=691 bgcolor=#fefefe
| 100691 ||  || — || December 25, 1997 || Saji || Saji Obs. || — || align=right | 1.3 km || 
|-id=692 bgcolor=#E9E9E9
| 100692 ||  || — || December 27, 1997 || Oizumi || T. Kobayashi || — || align=right | 5.9 km || 
|-id=693 bgcolor=#E9E9E9
| 100693 ||  || — || December 26, 1997 || Haleakala || NEAT || EUN || align=right | 3.2 km || 
|-id=694 bgcolor=#E9E9E9
| 100694 ||  || — || December 21, 1997 || Xinglong || SCAP || — || align=right | 2.4 km || 
|-id=695 bgcolor=#fefefe
| 100695 ||  || — || December 28, 1997 || Cloudcroft || W. Offutt || — || align=right | 1.4 km || 
|-id=696 bgcolor=#E9E9E9
| 100696 ||  || — || December 31, 1997 || Oizumi || T. Kobayashi || — || align=right | 2.0 km || 
|-id=697 bgcolor=#fefefe
| 100697 ||  || — || December 28, 1997 || Kitt Peak || Spacewatch || — || align=right | 1.3 km || 
|-id=698 bgcolor=#d6d6d6
| 100698 ||  || — || December 29, 1997 || Kitt Peak || Spacewatch || — || align=right | 4.4 km || 
|-id=699 bgcolor=#d6d6d6
| 100699 ||  || — || December 31, 1997 || Kitt Peak || Spacewatch || THM || align=right | 4.3 km || 
|-id=700 bgcolor=#fefefe
| 100700 ||  || — || December 31, 1997 || Kitt Peak || Spacewatch || — || align=right | 1.4 km || 
|}

100701–100800 

|-bgcolor=#fefefe
| 100701 ||  || — || January 5, 1998 || Oizumi || T. Kobayashi || — || align=right | 2.2 km || 
|-id=702 bgcolor=#fefefe
| 100702 ||  || — || January 1, 1998 || Kitt Peak || Spacewatch || — || align=right | 1.4 km || 
|-id=703 bgcolor=#E9E9E9
| 100703 ||  || — || January 5, 1998 || Chichibu || N. Satō || DOR || align=right | 4.7 km || 
|-id=704 bgcolor=#E9E9E9
| 100704 || 1998 BG || — || January 17, 1998 || Modra || P. Kolény, L. Kornoš || EUN || align=right | 2.9 km || 
|-id=705 bgcolor=#E9E9E9
| 100705 ||  || — || January 22, 1998 || Kitt Peak || Spacewatch || AGN || align=right | 2.1 km || 
|-id=706 bgcolor=#E9E9E9
| 100706 ||  || — || January 24, 1998 || Haleakala || NEAT || — || align=right | 4.5 km || 
|-id=707 bgcolor=#E9E9E9
| 100707 ||  || — || January 25, 1998 || Modra || A. Galád || AGN || align=right | 2.6 km || 
|-id=708 bgcolor=#E9E9E9
| 100708 ||  || — || January 22, 1998 || Kitt Peak || Spacewatch || — || align=right | 3.8 km || 
|-id=709 bgcolor=#fefefe
| 100709 ||  || — || January 22, 1998 || Kitt Peak || Spacewatch || — || align=right | 1.2 km || 
|-id=710 bgcolor=#fefefe
| 100710 ||  || — || January 22, 1998 || Kitt Peak || Spacewatch || — || align=right | 1.3 km || 
|-id=711 bgcolor=#fefefe
| 100711 ||  || — || January 27, 1998 || Sormano || A. Testa, P. Ghezzi || — || align=right | 1.5 km || 
|-id=712 bgcolor=#fefefe
| 100712 ||  || — || January 22, 1998 || Kitt Peak || Spacewatch || — || align=right | 1.3 km || 
|-id=713 bgcolor=#d6d6d6
| 100713 ||  || — || January 22, 1998 || Kitt Peak || Spacewatch || 628 || align=right | 3.9 km || 
|-id=714 bgcolor=#d6d6d6
| 100714 ||  || — || January 22, 1998 || Kitt Peak || Spacewatch || — || align=right | 7.5 km || 
|-id=715 bgcolor=#E9E9E9
| 100715 ||  || — || January 22, 1998 || Kitt Peak || Spacewatch || — || align=right | 4.0 km || 
|-id=716 bgcolor=#E9E9E9
| 100716 ||  || — || January 25, 1998 || Kitt Peak || Spacewatch || — || align=right | 2.8 km || 
|-id=717 bgcolor=#fefefe
| 100717 ||  || — || January 25, 1998 || Kitt Peak || Spacewatch || — || align=right | 1.8 km || 
|-id=718 bgcolor=#E9E9E9
| 100718 ||  || — || January 28, 1998 || Oizumi || T. Kobayashi || — || align=right | 2.4 km || 
|-id=719 bgcolor=#fefefe
| 100719 ||  || — || January 29, 1998 || Kleť || M. Tichý, Z. Moravec || — || align=right | 1.4 km || 
|-id=720 bgcolor=#d6d6d6
| 100720 ||  || — || January 23, 1998 || Kitt Peak || Spacewatch || 7:4 || align=right | 7.0 km || 
|-id=721 bgcolor=#fefefe
| 100721 ||  || — || January 25, 1998 || Kitt Peak || Spacewatch || FLO || align=right | 1.2 km || 
|-id=722 bgcolor=#fefefe
| 100722 ||  || — || January 29, 1998 || Kitt Peak || Spacewatch || — || align=right | 1.8 km || 
|-id=723 bgcolor=#fefefe
| 100723 ||  || — || January 28, 1998 || Kitt Peak || Spacewatch || — || align=right | 1.4 km || 
|-id=724 bgcolor=#E9E9E9
| 100724 ||  || — || January 29, 1998 || Kitt Peak || Spacewatch || AST || align=right | 3.3 km || 
|-id=725 bgcolor=#E9E9E9
| 100725 ||  || — || January 23, 1998 || Kitt Peak || Spacewatch || — || align=right | 5.5 km || 
|-id=726 bgcolor=#E9E9E9
| 100726 Marcoiozzi ||  ||  || January 25, 1998 || Cima Ekar || M. Tombelli, A. Boattini || — || align=right | 5.2 km || 
|-id=727 bgcolor=#d6d6d6
| 100727 ||  || — || January 22, 1998 || Kitt Peak || Spacewatch || — || align=right | 7.0 km || 
|-id=728 bgcolor=#E9E9E9
| 100728 Kamenice n Lipou || 1998 CK ||  || February 2, 1998 || Kleť || M. Tichý, Z. Moravec || — || align=right | 3.7 km || 
|-id=729 bgcolor=#E9E9E9
| 100729 || 1998 CX || — || February 5, 1998 || Kleť || M. Tichý, Z. Moravec || WIT || align=right | 2.1 km || 
|-id=730 bgcolor=#fefefe
| 100730 ||  || — || February 13, 1998 || San Marcello || L. Tesi, A. Boattini || — || align=right | 2.0 km || 
|-id=731 bgcolor=#E9E9E9
| 100731 Ara Pacis || 1998 DO ||  || February 18, 1998 || Colleverde || V. S. Casulli || — || align=right | 3.9 km || 
|-id=732 bgcolor=#E9E9E9
| 100732 Blankavalois || 1998 DQ ||  || February 19, 1998 || Kleť || M. Tichý || — || align=right | 3.7 km || 
|-id=733 bgcolor=#fefefe
| 100733 Annafalcká ||  ||  || February 18, 1998 || Kleť || M. Tichý || FLO || align=right | 1.0 km || 
|-id=734 bgcolor=#d6d6d6
| 100734 Annasvídnická ||  ||  || February 18, 1998 || Kleť || M. Tichý || THM || align=right | 3.6 km || 
|-id=735 bgcolor=#fefefe
| 100735 Alpomořanská ||  ||  || February 19, 1998 || Kleť || M. Tichý, J. Tichá || — || align=right | 1.3 km || 
|-id=736 bgcolor=#d6d6d6
| 100736 ||  || — || February 17, 1998 || Kitt Peak || Spacewatch || — || align=right | 5.4 km || 
|-id=737 bgcolor=#fefefe
| 100737 ||  || — || February 23, 1998 || Modra || A. Galád, A. Pravda || V || align=right | 1.0 km || 
|-id=738 bgcolor=#fefefe
| 100738 ||  || — || February 23, 1998 || Kitt Peak || Spacewatch || — || align=right | 1.8 km || 
|-id=739 bgcolor=#fefefe
| 100739 ||  || — || February 27, 1998 || Caussols || ODAS || — || align=right | 1.6 km || 
|-id=740 bgcolor=#E9E9E9
| 100740 ||  || — || February 24, 1998 || Kitt Peak || Spacewatch || ADE || align=right | 5.2 km || 
|-id=741 bgcolor=#E9E9E9
| 100741 ||  || — || February 26, 1998 || Farra d'Isonzo || Farra d'Isonzo || — || align=right | 2.9 km || 
|-id=742 bgcolor=#fefefe
| 100742 ||  || — || February 23, 1998 || Kitt Peak || Spacewatch || MAS || align=right data-sort-value="0.96" | 960 m || 
|-id=743 bgcolor=#FA8072
| 100743 ||  || — || February 23, 1998 || Kitt Peak || Spacewatch || — || align=right | 1.7 km || 
|-id=744 bgcolor=#fefefe
| 100744 ||  || — || February 28, 1998 || La Silla || C.-I. Lagerkvist || FLO || align=right | 1.5 km || 
|-id=745 bgcolor=#fefefe
| 100745 ||  || — || March 2, 1998 || Oizumi || T. Kobayashi || — || align=right | 2.1 km || 
|-id=746 bgcolor=#fefefe
| 100746 ||  || — || March 2, 1998 || Kitt Peak || Spacewatch || — || align=right | 1.5 km || 
|-id=747 bgcolor=#fefefe
| 100747 ||  || — || March 3, 1998 || Teide || Teide Obs. || — || align=right | 1.1 km || 
|-id=748 bgcolor=#fefefe
| 100748 ||  || — || March 1, 1998 || Kitt Peak || Spacewatch || ERI || align=right | 2.4 km || 
|-id=749 bgcolor=#fefefe
| 100749 ||  || — || March 1, 1998 || Kitt Peak || Spacewatch || V || align=right | 1.2 km || 
|-id=750 bgcolor=#E9E9E9
| 100750 ||  || — || March 6, 1998 || Gekko || T. Kagawa || — || align=right | 4.4 km || 
|-id=751 bgcolor=#fefefe
| 100751 ||  || — || March 1, 1998 || La Silla || E. W. Elst || — || align=right | 2.0 km || 
|-id=752 bgcolor=#fefefe
| 100752 ||  || — || March 3, 1998 || La Silla || E. W. Elst || — || align=right | 1.7 km || 
|-id=753 bgcolor=#E9E9E9
| 100753 ||  || — || March 19, 1998 || Mallorca || Á. López J., R. Pacheco || — || align=right | 2.9 km || 
|-id=754 bgcolor=#FA8072
| 100754 ||  || — || March 20, 1998 || Socorro || LINEAR || — || align=right | 1.5 km || 
|-id=755 bgcolor=#E9E9E9
| 100755 ||  || — || March 20, 1998 || Kitt Peak || Spacewatch || — || align=right | 3.2 km || 
|-id=756 bgcolor=#FFC2E0
| 100756 ||  || — || March 24, 1998 || Haleakala || NEAT || APO +1km || align=right | 1.8 km || 
|-id=757 bgcolor=#fefefe
| 100757 ||  || — || March 20, 1998 || Kitt Peak || Spacewatch || — || align=right data-sort-value="0.99" | 990 m || 
|-id=758 bgcolor=#fefefe
| 100758 ||  || — || March 20, 1998 || Kitt Peak || Spacewatch || FLO || align=right | 1.5 km || 
|-id=759 bgcolor=#d6d6d6
| 100759 ||  || — || March 22, 1998 || Kitt Peak || Spacewatch || — || align=right | 6.9 km || 
|-id=760 bgcolor=#fefefe
| 100760 ||  || — || March 24, 1998 || Caussols || ODAS || NYS || align=right | 1.1 km || 
|-id=761 bgcolor=#fefefe
| 100761 ||  || — || March 24, 1998 || Caussols || ODAS || — || align=right | 1.7 km || 
|-id=762 bgcolor=#d6d6d6
| 100762 ||  || — || March 26, 1998 || Caussols || ODAS || — || align=right | 4.5 km || 
|-id=763 bgcolor=#fefefe
| 100763 ||  || — || March 20, 1998 || Socorro || LINEAR || — || align=right | 2.0 km || 
|-id=764 bgcolor=#fefefe
| 100764 ||  || — || March 20, 1998 || Socorro || LINEAR || — || align=right | 1.9 km || 
|-id=765 bgcolor=#fefefe
| 100765 ||  || — || March 20, 1998 || Socorro || LINEAR || — || align=right | 1.8 km || 
|-id=766 bgcolor=#FA8072
| 100766 ||  || — || March 20, 1998 || Socorro || LINEAR || — || align=right | 2.2 km || 
|-id=767 bgcolor=#fefefe
| 100767 ||  || — || March 20, 1998 || Socorro || LINEAR || NYS || align=right | 2.4 km || 
|-id=768 bgcolor=#d6d6d6
| 100768 ||  || — || March 20, 1998 || Socorro || LINEAR || — || align=right | 4.7 km || 
|-id=769 bgcolor=#fefefe
| 100769 ||  || — || March 20, 1998 || Socorro || LINEAR || — || align=right | 1.5 km || 
|-id=770 bgcolor=#fefefe
| 100770 ||  || — || March 20, 1998 || Socorro || LINEAR || — || align=right | 1.7 km || 
|-id=771 bgcolor=#fefefe
| 100771 ||  || — || March 20, 1998 || Socorro || LINEAR || — || align=right | 1.5 km || 
|-id=772 bgcolor=#E9E9E9
| 100772 ||  || — || March 20, 1998 || Socorro || LINEAR || — || align=right | 5.0 km || 
|-id=773 bgcolor=#fefefe
| 100773 ||  || — || March 20, 1998 || Socorro || LINEAR || — || align=right | 1.6 km || 
|-id=774 bgcolor=#fefefe
| 100774 ||  || — || March 20, 1998 || Socorro || LINEAR || — || align=right | 1.6 km || 
|-id=775 bgcolor=#d6d6d6
| 100775 ||  || — || March 20, 1998 || Socorro || LINEAR || — || align=right | 4.6 km || 
|-id=776 bgcolor=#fefefe
| 100776 ||  || — || March 20, 1998 || Socorro || LINEAR || — || align=right | 1.6 km || 
|-id=777 bgcolor=#fefefe
| 100777 ||  || — || March 20, 1998 || Socorro || LINEAR || NYS || align=right | 1.0 km || 
|-id=778 bgcolor=#fefefe
| 100778 ||  || — || March 20, 1998 || Socorro || LINEAR || FLO || align=right | 1.2 km || 
|-id=779 bgcolor=#fefefe
| 100779 ||  || — || March 20, 1998 || Socorro || LINEAR || FLO || align=right | 1.3 km || 
|-id=780 bgcolor=#fefefe
| 100780 ||  || — || March 20, 1998 || Socorro || LINEAR || NYS || align=right | 1.4 km || 
|-id=781 bgcolor=#E9E9E9
| 100781 ||  || — || March 20, 1998 || Socorro || LINEAR || — || align=right | 5.3 km || 
|-id=782 bgcolor=#fefefe
| 100782 ||  || — || March 20, 1998 || Socorro || LINEAR || — || align=right | 1.8 km || 
|-id=783 bgcolor=#fefefe
| 100783 ||  || — || March 20, 1998 || Socorro || LINEAR || — || align=right | 1.8 km || 
|-id=784 bgcolor=#fefefe
| 100784 ||  || — || March 20, 1998 || Socorro || LINEAR || ERI || align=right | 4.6 km || 
|-id=785 bgcolor=#fefefe
| 100785 ||  || — || March 20, 1998 || Socorro || LINEAR || — || align=right | 1.6 km || 
|-id=786 bgcolor=#fefefe
| 100786 ||  || — || March 20, 1998 || Socorro || LINEAR || — || align=right | 1.4 km || 
|-id=787 bgcolor=#fefefe
| 100787 ||  || — || March 20, 1998 || Socorro || LINEAR || — || align=right | 1.9 km || 
|-id=788 bgcolor=#E9E9E9
| 100788 ||  || — || March 20, 1998 || Socorro || LINEAR || HNA || align=right | 4.4 km || 
|-id=789 bgcolor=#fefefe
| 100789 ||  || — || March 21, 1998 || Bergisch Gladbach || W. Bickel || — || align=right | 1.3 km || 
|-id=790 bgcolor=#d6d6d6
| 100790 ||  || — || March 24, 1998 || Bergisch Gladbach || W. Bickel || EOS || align=right | 3.3 km || 
|-id=791 bgcolor=#fefefe
| 100791 ||  || — || March 24, 1998 || Socorro || LINEAR || — || align=right | 2.4 km || 
|-id=792 bgcolor=#fefefe
| 100792 ||  || — || March 24, 1998 || Socorro || LINEAR || V || align=right | 1.2 km || 
|-id=793 bgcolor=#fefefe
| 100793 ||  || — || March 24, 1998 || Socorro || LINEAR || — || align=right | 1.9 km || 
|-id=794 bgcolor=#fefefe
| 100794 ||  || — || March 24, 1998 || Socorro || LINEAR || FLO || align=right | 1.1 km || 
|-id=795 bgcolor=#fefefe
| 100795 ||  || — || March 24, 1998 || Socorro || LINEAR || — || align=right | 2.3 km || 
|-id=796 bgcolor=#fefefe
| 100796 ||  || — || March 24, 1998 || Socorro || LINEAR || — || align=right | 2.0 km || 
|-id=797 bgcolor=#d6d6d6
| 100797 ||  || — || March 24, 1998 || Socorro || LINEAR || — || align=right | 6.3 km || 
|-id=798 bgcolor=#fefefe
| 100798 ||  || — || March 24, 1998 || Socorro || LINEAR || — || align=right | 1.6 km || 
|-id=799 bgcolor=#fefefe
| 100799 ||  || — || March 24, 1998 || Socorro || LINEAR || — || align=right | 2.4 km || 
|-id=800 bgcolor=#E9E9E9
| 100800 ||  || — || March 24, 1998 || Socorro || LINEAR || — || align=right | 4.5 km || 
|}

100801–100900 

|-bgcolor=#fefefe
| 100801 ||  || — || March 24, 1998 || Socorro || LINEAR || FLO || align=right | 1.7 km || 
|-id=802 bgcolor=#E9E9E9
| 100802 ||  || — || March 24, 1998 || Socorro || LINEAR || — || align=right | 2.6 km || 
|-id=803 bgcolor=#E9E9E9
| 100803 ||  || — || March 31, 1998 || Socorro || LINEAR || — || align=right | 4.3 km || 
|-id=804 bgcolor=#fefefe
| 100804 ||  || — || March 31, 1998 || Socorro || LINEAR || — || align=right | 1.7 km || 
|-id=805 bgcolor=#fefefe
| 100805 ||  || — || March 31, 1998 || Socorro || LINEAR || FLO || align=right | 1.6 km || 
|-id=806 bgcolor=#fefefe
| 100806 ||  || — || March 31, 1998 || Socorro || LINEAR || — || align=right | 2.0 km || 
|-id=807 bgcolor=#E9E9E9
| 100807 ||  || — || March 31, 1998 || Socorro || LINEAR || — || align=right | 1.8 km || 
|-id=808 bgcolor=#fefefe
| 100808 ||  || — || March 31, 1998 || Socorro || LINEAR || — || align=right | 1.6 km || 
|-id=809 bgcolor=#fefefe
| 100809 ||  || — || March 31, 1998 || Socorro || LINEAR || — || align=right | 2.6 km || 
|-id=810 bgcolor=#fefefe
| 100810 ||  || — || March 20, 1998 || Socorro || LINEAR || — || align=right | 1.3 km || 
|-id=811 bgcolor=#fefefe
| 100811 ||  || — || March 20, 1998 || Socorro || LINEAR || — || align=right | 1.5 km || 
|-id=812 bgcolor=#E9E9E9
| 100812 ||  || — || March 20, 1998 || Socorro || LINEAR || ADE || align=right | 4.5 km || 
|-id=813 bgcolor=#E9E9E9
| 100813 ||  || — || March 24, 1998 || Socorro || LINEAR || — || align=right | 3.3 km || 
|-id=814 bgcolor=#fefefe
| 100814 ||  || — || March 24, 1998 || Socorro || LINEAR || — || align=right | 1.4 km || 
|-id=815 bgcolor=#E9E9E9
| 100815 ||  || — || March 31, 1998 || Socorro || LINEAR || DOR || align=right | 6.7 km || 
|-id=816 bgcolor=#fefefe
| 100816 ||  || — || March 22, 1998 || Socorro || LINEAR || NYS || align=right | 1.2 km || 
|-id=817 bgcolor=#fefefe
| 100817 ||  || — || March 20, 1998 || Socorro || LINEAR || — || align=right | 1.5 km || 
|-id=818 bgcolor=#fefefe
| 100818 ||  || — || March 20, 1998 || Socorro || LINEAR || EUT || align=right | 1.1 km || 
|-id=819 bgcolor=#d6d6d6
| 100819 ||  || — || March 20, 1998 || Socorro || LINEAR || — || align=right | 4.6 km || 
|-id=820 bgcolor=#fefefe
| 100820 ||  || — || March 28, 1998 || Socorro || LINEAR || — || align=right | 1.8 km || 
|-id=821 bgcolor=#fefefe
| 100821 ||  || — || March 28, 1998 || Socorro || LINEAR || — || align=right | 1.4 km || 
|-id=822 bgcolor=#fefefe
| 100822 ||  || — || March 29, 1998 || Socorro || LINEAR || — || align=right | 1.8 km || 
|-id=823 bgcolor=#E9E9E9
| 100823 ||  || — || March 29, 1998 || Socorro || LINEAR || — || align=right | 4.2 km || 
|-id=824 bgcolor=#fefefe
| 100824 ||  || — || March 29, 1998 || Socorro || LINEAR || — || align=right | 1.6 km || 
|-id=825 bgcolor=#fefefe
| 100825 ||  || — || March 24, 1998 || Socorro || LINEAR || — || align=right | 1.6 km || 
|-id=826 bgcolor=#fefefe
| 100826 ||  || — || April 18, 1998 || Kitt Peak || Spacewatch || NYS || align=right | 1.2 km || 
|-id=827 bgcolor=#E9E9E9
| 100827 ||  || — || April 20, 1998 || Kitt Peak || Spacewatch || — || align=right | 2.6 km || 
|-id=828 bgcolor=#fefefe
| 100828 ||  || — || April 21, 1998 || Caussols || ODAS || — || align=right | 1.9 km || 
|-id=829 bgcolor=#fefefe
| 100829 ||  || — || April 17, 1998 || Kitt Peak || Spacewatch || — || align=right | 1.3 km || 
|-id=830 bgcolor=#d6d6d6
| 100830 ||  || — || April 19, 1998 || Kitt Peak || Spacewatch || — || align=right | 5.5 km || 
|-id=831 bgcolor=#fefefe
| 100831 ||  || — || April 19, 1998 || Kitt Peak || Spacewatch || NYS || align=right | 1.5 km || 
|-id=832 bgcolor=#fefefe
| 100832 ||  || — || April 17, 1998 || Kitt Peak || Spacewatch || — || align=right | 1.5 km || 
|-id=833 bgcolor=#d6d6d6
| 100833 ||  || — || April 17, 1998 || Kitt Peak || Spacewatch || HYG || align=right | 5.7 km || 
|-id=834 bgcolor=#fefefe
| 100834 ||  || — || April 24, 1998 || Kitt Peak || Spacewatch || FLO || align=right | 1.1 km || 
|-id=835 bgcolor=#fefefe
| 100835 ||  || — || April 24, 1998 || Haleakala || NEAT || — || align=right | 2.1 km || 
|-id=836 bgcolor=#d6d6d6
| 100836 ||  || — || April 22, 1998 || Kitt Peak || Spacewatch || HYG || align=right | 6.2 km || 
|-id=837 bgcolor=#fefefe
| 100837 ||  || — || April 20, 1998 || Kitt Peak || Spacewatch || FLO || align=right | 1.4 km || 
|-id=838 bgcolor=#fefefe
| 100838 ||  || — || April 22, 1998 || Kitt Peak || Spacewatch || — || align=right | 1.5 km || 
|-id=839 bgcolor=#fefefe
| 100839 ||  || — || April 18, 1998 || Socorro || LINEAR || — || align=right | 1.4 km || 
|-id=840 bgcolor=#fefefe
| 100840 ||  || — || April 18, 1998 || Socorro || LINEAR || — || align=right | 4.1 km || 
|-id=841 bgcolor=#fefefe
| 100841 ||  || — || April 18, 1998 || Socorro || LINEAR || PHO || align=right | 4.7 km || 
|-id=842 bgcolor=#E9E9E9
| 100842 ||  || — || April 18, 1998 || Socorro || LINEAR || — || align=right | 4.8 km || 
|-id=843 bgcolor=#fefefe
| 100843 ||  || — || April 20, 1998 || Socorro || LINEAR || EUT || align=right | 1.2 km || 
|-id=844 bgcolor=#d6d6d6
| 100844 ||  || — || April 20, 1998 || Socorro || LINEAR || — || align=right | 4.9 km || 
|-id=845 bgcolor=#fefefe
| 100845 ||  || — || April 28, 1998 || Kitt Peak || Spacewatch || — || align=right | 1.6 km || 
|-id=846 bgcolor=#fefefe
| 100846 ||  || — || April 20, 1998 || Kitt Peak || Spacewatch || — || align=right | 2.2 km || 
|-id=847 bgcolor=#fefefe
| 100847 ||  || — || April 20, 1998 || Kitt Peak || Spacewatch || — || align=right | 1.6 km || 
|-id=848 bgcolor=#fefefe
| 100848 ||  || — || April 20, 1998 || Socorro || LINEAR || — || align=right | 2.1 km || 
|-id=849 bgcolor=#fefefe
| 100849 ||  || — || April 20, 1998 || Socorro || LINEAR || V || align=right | 1.2 km || 
|-id=850 bgcolor=#fefefe
| 100850 ||  || — || April 22, 1998 || Socorro || LINEAR || PHO || align=right | 2.0 km || 
|-id=851 bgcolor=#fefefe
| 100851 ||  || — || April 20, 1998 || Socorro || LINEAR || FLO || align=right | 1.4 km || 
|-id=852 bgcolor=#fefefe
| 100852 ||  || — || April 20, 1998 || Socorro || LINEAR || — || align=right | 2.1 km || 
|-id=853 bgcolor=#E9E9E9
| 100853 ||  || — || April 20, 1998 || Socorro || LINEAR || — || align=right | 2.8 km || 
|-id=854 bgcolor=#fefefe
| 100854 ||  || — || April 20, 1998 || Socorro || LINEAR || NYS || align=right | 1.7 km || 
|-id=855 bgcolor=#fefefe
| 100855 ||  || — || April 20, 1998 || Socorro || LINEAR || NYS || align=right | 1.5 km || 
|-id=856 bgcolor=#fefefe
| 100856 ||  || — || April 20, 1998 || Socorro || LINEAR || MAS || align=right | 1.6 km || 
|-id=857 bgcolor=#E9E9E9
| 100857 ||  || — || April 20, 1998 || Socorro || LINEAR || — || align=right | 4.8 km || 
|-id=858 bgcolor=#d6d6d6
| 100858 ||  || — || April 20, 1998 || Socorro || LINEAR || — || align=right | 7.5 km || 
|-id=859 bgcolor=#E9E9E9
| 100859 ||  || — || April 20, 1998 || Socorro || LINEAR || — || align=right | 4.8 km || 
|-id=860 bgcolor=#fefefe
| 100860 ||  || — || April 30, 1998 || Anderson Mesa || LONEOS || — || align=right | 1.7 km || 
|-id=861 bgcolor=#d6d6d6
| 100861 ||  || — || April 21, 1998 || Socorro || LINEAR || — || align=right | 4.3 km || 
|-id=862 bgcolor=#d6d6d6
| 100862 ||  || — || April 21, 1998 || Socorro || LINEAR || HYG || align=right | 5.6 km || 
|-id=863 bgcolor=#fefefe
| 100863 ||  || — || April 21, 1998 || Socorro || LINEAR || — || align=right | 1.5 km || 
|-id=864 bgcolor=#d6d6d6
| 100864 ||  || — || April 21, 1998 || Socorro || LINEAR || — || align=right | 3.8 km || 
|-id=865 bgcolor=#fefefe
| 100865 ||  || — || April 21, 1998 || Socorro || LINEAR || — || align=right | 2.3 km || 
|-id=866 bgcolor=#E9E9E9
| 100866 ||  || — || April 21, 1998 || Socorro || LINEAR || — || align=right | 2.9 km || 
|-id=867 bgcolor=#fefefe
| 100867 ||  || — || April 21, 1998 || Socorro || LINEAR || — || align=right | 1.3 km || 
|-id=868 bgcolor=#fefefe
| 100868 ||  || — || April 21, 1998 || Socorro || LINEAR || — || align=right | 1.6 km || 
|-id=869 bgcolor=#d6d6d6
| 100869 ||  || — || April 21, 1998 || Socorro || LINEAR || EOS || align=right | 4.4 km || 
|-id=870 bgcolor=#fefefe
| 100870 ||  || — || April 21, 1998 || Socorro || LINEAR || NYS || align=right | 1.5 km || 
|-id=871 bgcolor=#fefefe
| 100871 ||  || — || April 21, 1998 || Socorro || LINEAR || — || align=right | 1.1 km || 
|-id=872 bgcolor=#d6d6d6
| 100872 ||  || — || April 21, 1998 || Socorro || LINEAR || — || align=right | 7.5 km || 
|-id=873 bgcolor=#fefefe
| 100873 ||  || — || April 21, 1998 || Socorro || LINEAR || NYS || align=right | 1.2 km || 
|-id=874 bgcolor=#d6d6d6
| 100874 ||  || — || April 21, 1998 || Socorro || LINEAR || — || align=right | 6.0 km || 
|-id=875 bgcolor=#fefefe
| 100875 ||  || — || April 21, 1998 || Socorro || LINEAR || FLO || align=right | 1.5 km || 
|-id=876 bgcolor=#fefefe
| 100876 ||  || — || April 21, 1998 || Socorro || LINEAR || — || align=right | 1.2 km || 
|-id=877 bgcolor=#d6d6d6
| 100877 ||  || — || April 21, 1998 || Socorro || LINEAR || — || align=right | 6.4 km || 
|-id=878 bgcolor=#fefefe
| 100878 ||  || — || April 21, 1998 || Socorro || LINEAR || NYS || align=right data-sort-value="0.87" | 870 m || 
|-id=879 bgcolor=#fefefe
| 100879 ||  || — || April 21, 1998 || Socorro || LINEAR || — || align=right | 1.3 km || 
|-id=880 bgcolor=#d6d6d6
| 100880 ||  || — || April 21, 1998 || Socorro || LINEAR || HYG || align=right | 6.2 km || 
|-id=881 bgcolor=#fefefe
| 100881 ||  || — || April 21, 1998 || Socorro || LINEAR || ERI || align=right | 2.7 km || 
|-id=882 bgcolor=#fefefe
| 100882 ||  || — || April 21, 1998 || Socorro || LINEAR || NYS || align=right data-sort-value="0.96" | 960 m || 
|-id=883 bgcolor=#fefefe
| 100883 ||  || — || April 25, 1998 || La Silla || E. W. Elst || — || align=right | 1.5 km || 
|-id=884 bgcolor=#fefefe
| 100884 ||  || — || April 25, 1998 || La Silla || E. W. Elst || — || align=right | 2.0 km || 
|-id=885 bgcolor=#fefefe
| 100885 ||  || — || April 23, 1998 || Socorro || LINEAR || — || align=right | 1.9 km || 
|-id=886 bgcolor=#fefefe
| 100886 ||  || — || April 23, 1998 || Socorro || LINEAR || — || align=right | 2.0 km || 
|-id=887 bgcolor=#d6d6d6
| 100887 ||  || — || April 23, 1998 || Socorro || LINEAR || — || align=right | 7.1 km || 
|-id=888 bgcolor=#fefefe
| 100888 ||  || — || April 23, 1998 || Socorro || LINEAR || V || align=right | 1.3 km || 
|-id=889 bgcolor=#fefefe
| 100889 ||  || — || April 23, 1998 || Socorro || LINEAR || FLO || align=right | 1.6 km || 
|-id=890 bgcolor=#fefefe
| 100890 ||  || — || April 23, 1998 || Socorro || LINEAR || FLO || align=right | 1.3 km || 
|-id=891 bgcolor=#fefefe
| 100891 ||  || — || April 23, 1998 || Socorro || LINEAR || — || align=right | 1.9 km || 
|-id=892 bgcolor=#fefefe
| 100892 ||  || — || April 23, 1998 || Socorro || LINEAR || — || align=right | 1.8 km || 
|-id=893 bgcolor=#d6d6d6
| 100893 ||  || — || April 19, 1998 || Socorro || LINEAR || — || align=right | 6.6 km || 
|-id=894 bgcolor=#fefefe
| 100894 ||  || — || April 21, 1998 || Socorro || LINEAR || — || align=right | 1.8 km || 
|-id=895 bgcolor=#d6d6d6
| 100895 ||  || — || April 22, 1998 || Socorro || LINEAR || — || align=right | 5.5 km || 
|-id=896 bgcolor=#d6d6d6
| 100896 ||  || — || May 6, 1998 || Caussols || ODAS || HYG || align=right | 6.5 km || 
|-id=897 bgcolor=#fefefe
| 100897 Piatra Neamt ||  ||  || May 5, 1998 || San Marcello || L. Tesi, A. Caronia || — || align=right | 1.4 km || 
|-id=898 bgcolor=#fefefe
| 100898 ||  || — || May 15, 1998 || Woomera || F. B. Zoltowski || NYS || align=right | 1.3 km || 
|-id=899 bgcolor=#fefefe
| 100899 ||  || — || May 24, 1998 || Kitt Peak || Spacewatch || NYS || align=right | 1.2 km || 
|-id=900 bgcolor=#fefefe
| 100900 ||  || — || May 22, 1998 || Anderson Mesa || LONEOS || — || align=right | 1.8 km || 
|}

100901–101000 

|-bgcolor=#fefefe
| 100901 ||  || — || May 22, 1998 || Anderson Mesa || LONEOS || — || align=right | 1.7 km || 
|-id=902 bgcolor=#fefefe
| 100902 ||  || — || May 23, 1998 || Anderson Mesa || LONEOS || — || align=right | 2.0 km || 
|-id=903 bgcolor=#fefefe
| 100903 ||  || — || May 23, 1998 || Anderson Mesa || LONEOS || — || align=right | 1.7 km || 
|-id=904 bgcolor=#d6d6d6
| 100904 ||  || — || May 22, 1998 || Kitt Peak || Spacewatch || EOS || align=right | 3.7 km || 
|-id=905 bgcolor=#d6d6d6
| 100905 ||  || — || May 26, 1998 || Kitt Peak || Spacewatch || URS || align=right | 7.0 km || 
|-id=906 bgcolor=#fefefe
| 100906 ||  || — || May 22, 1998 || Socorro || LINEAR || FLO || align=right | 1.1 km || 
|-id=907 bgcolor=#E9E9E9
| 100907 ||  || — || May 22, 1998 || Socorro || LINEAR || — || align=right | 5.8 km || 
|-id=908 bgcolor=#FA8072
| 100908 ||  || — || May 28, 1998 || Socorro || LINEAR || — || align=right | 1.8 km || 
|-id=909 bgcolor=#fefefe
| 100909 ||  || — || May 22, 1998 || Socorro || LINEAR || NYS || align=right | 1.3 km || 
|-id=910 bgcolor=#fefefe
| 100910 ||  || — || May 22, 1998 || Socorro || LINEAR || — || align=right | 2.1 km || 
|-id=911 bgcolor=#fefefe
| 100911 ||  || — || May 22, 1998 || Socorro || LINEAR || ERI || align=right | 2.6 km || 
|-id=912 bgcolor=#d6d6d6
| 100912 ||  || — || May 28, 1998 || Kitt Peak || Spacewatch || ALA || align=right | 8.8 km || 
|-id=913 bgcolor=#fefefe
| 100913 ||  || — || May 22, 1998 || Socorro || LINEAR || — || align=right | 1.6 km || 
|-id=914 bgcolor=#fefefe
| 100914 ||  || — || May 22, 1998 || Socorro || LINEAR || NYS || align=right | 1.6 km || 
|-id=915 bgcolor=#fefefe
| 100915 ||  || — || May 23, 1998 || Socorro || LINEAR || — || align=right | 3.7 km || 
|-id=916 bgcolor=#d6d6d6
| 100916 ||  || — || May 23, 1998 || Socorro || LINEAR || — || align=right | 4.6 km || 
|-id=917 bgcolor=#fefefe
| 100917 ||  || — || May 23, 1998 || Socorro || LINEAR || — || align=right | 2.0 km || 
|-id=918 bgcolor=#fefefe
| 100918 ||  || — || May 23, 1998 || Socorro || LINEAR || — || align=right | 2.0 km || 
|-id=919 bgcolor=#fefefe
| 100919 ||  || — || May 23, 1998 || Socorro || LINEAR || — || align=right | 4.3 km || 
|-id=920 bgcolor=#fefefe
| 100920 ||  || — || May 23, 1998 || Socorro || LINEAR || FLO || align=right | 1.3 km || 
|-id=921 bgcolor=#fefefe
| 100921 ||  || — || May 23, 1998 || Socorro || LINEAR || — || align=right | 2.0 km || 
|-id=922 bgcolor=#FA8072
| 100922 ||  || — || May 23, 1998 || Socorro || LINEAR || — || align=right | 2.4 km || 
|-id=923 bgcolor=#fefefe
| 100923 ||  || — || June 1, 1998 || La Silla || E. W. Elst || NYS || align=right | 1.2 km || 
|-id=924 bgcolor=#fefefe
| 100924 Luctuymans ||  ||  || June 1, 1998 || La Silla || E. W. Elst || NYS || align=right | 1.1 km || 
|-id=925 bgcolor=#fefefe
| 100925 ||  || — || June 1, 1998 || La Silla || E. W. Elst || — || align=right | 2.1 km || 
|-id=926 bgcolor=#FFC2E0
| 100926 || 1998 MQ || — || June 18, 1998 || Anderson Mesa || LONEOS || AMO +1km || align=right | 1.2 km || 
|-id=927 bgcolor=#d6d6d6
| 100927 ||  || — || June 16, 1998 || Kitt Peak || Spacewatch || HYG || align=right | 5.5 km || 
|-id=928 bgcolor=#E9E9E9
| 100928 ||  || — || June 23, 1998 || Kitt Peak || Spacewatch || — || align=right | 1.8 km || 
|-id=929 bgcolor=#E9E9E9
| 100929 ||  || — || June 20, 1998 || Kitt Peak || Spacewatch || — || align=right | 4.5 km || 
|-id=930 bgcolor=#fefefe
| 100930 ||  || — || June 19, 1998 || Socorro || LINEAR || — || align=right | 1.5 km || 
|-id=931 bgcolor=#fefefe
| 100931 ||  || — || June 19, 1998 || Socorro || LINEAR || — || align=right | 1.8 km || 
|-id=932 bgcolor=#fefefe
| 100932 ||  || — || June 22, 1998 || Kitt Peak || Spacewatch || — || align=right | 2.2 km || 
|-id=933 bgcolor=#FA8072
| 100933 ||  || — || June 30, 1998 || Socorro || LINEAR || — || align=right | 2.2 km || 
|-id=934 bgcolor=#fefefe
| 100934 Marthanussbaum ||  ||  || June 28, 1998 || La Silla || E. W. Elst || NYS || align=right | 1.3 km || 
|-id=935 bgcolor=#FA8072
| 100935 ||  || — || June 26, 1998 || Reedy Creek || J. Broughton || — || align=right | 2.4 km || 
|-id=936 bgcolor=#fefefe
| 100936 Mekong ||  ||  || June 26, 1998 || La Silla || E. W. Elst || — || align=right | 1.8 km || 
|-id=937 bgcolor=#fefefe
| 100937 ||  || — || June 26, 1998 || La Silla || E. W. Elst || NYS || align=right | 1.7 km || 
|-id=938 bgcolor=#E9E9E9
| 100938 ||  || — || June 26, 1998 || La Silla || E. W. Elst || CLO || align=right | 4.9 km || 
|-id=939 bgcolor=#fefefe
| 100939 ||  || — || June 23, 1998 || Anderson Mesa || LONEOS || — || align=right | 1.7 km || 
|-id=940 bgcolor=#E9E9E9
| 100940 Maunder ||  ||  || June 28, 1998 || La Silla || E. W. Elst || — || align=right | 4.5 km || 
|-id=941 bgcolor=#fefefe
| 100941 ||  || — || June 28, 1998 || La Silla || E. W. Elst || NYS || align=right | 1.4 km || 
|-id=942 bgcolor=#fefefe
| 100942 ||  || — || July 23, 1998 || Caussols || ODAS || — || align=right | 1.5 km || 
|-id=943 bgcolor=#fefefe
| 100943 ||  || — || July 27, 1998 || Caussols || ODAS || V || align=right | 1.3 km || 
|-id=944 bgcolor=#fefefe
| 100944 ||  || — || July 26, 1998 || La Silla || E. W. Elst || NYS || align=right | 1.3 km || 
|-id=945 bgcolor=#fefefe
| 100945 ||  || — || July 26, 1998 || La Silla || E. W. Elst || — || align=right | 1.8 km || 
|-id=946 bgcolor=#fefefe
| 100946 ||  || — || July 26, 1998 || La Silla || E. W. Elst || NYS || align=right | 1.3 km || 
|-id=947 bgcolor=#E9E9E9
| 100947 ||  || — || July 26, 1998 || La Silla || E. W. Elst || — || align=right | 4.7 km || 
|-id=948 bgcolor=#fefefe
| 100948 ||  || — || July 26, 1998 || La Silla || E. W. Elst || NYS || align=right | 1.4 km || 
|-id=949 bgcolor=#fefefe
| 100949 ||  || — || July 26, 1998 || La Silla || E. W. Elst || — || align=right | 1.1 km || 
|-id=950 bgcolor=#fefefe
| 100950 || 1998 PA || — || August 1, 1998 || Višnjan Observatory || Višnjan Obs. || NYS || align=right | 1.5 km || 
|-id=951 bgcolor=#fefefe
| 100951 ||  || — || August 17, 1998 || Socorro || LINEAR || — || align=right | 2.0 km || 
|-id=952 bgcolor=#FA8072
| 100952 ||  || — || August 19, 1998 || Socorro || LINEAR || — || align=right | 2.0 km || 
|-id=953 bgcolor=#E9E9E9
| 100953 ||  || — || August 24, 1998 || Caussols || ODAS || — || align=right | 2.7 km || 
|-id=954 bgcolor=#E9E9E9
| 100954 ||  || — || August 24, 1998 || Caussols || ODAS || — || align=right | 3.3 km || 
|-id=955 bgcolor=#fefefe
| 100955 ||  || — || August 17, 1998 || Socorro || LINEAR || — || align=right | 2.0 km || 
|-id=956 bgcolor=#fefefe
| 100956 ||  || — || August 17, 1998 || Socorro || LINEAR || — || align=right | 1.7 km || 
|-id=957 bgcolor=#fefefe
| 100957 ||  || — || August 17, 1998 || Socorro || LINEAR || — || align=right | 1.7 km || 
|-id=958 bgcolor=#fefefe
| 100958 ||  || — || August 17, 1998 || Socorro || LINEAR || FLO || align=right | 2.2 km || 
|-id=959 bgcolor=#E9E9E9
| 100959 ||  || — || August 17, 1998 || Socorro || LINEAR || — || align=right | 5.3 km || 
|-id=960 bgcolor=#E9E9E9
| 100960 ||  || — || August 17, 1998 || Socorro || LINEAR || RAF || align=right | 3.8 km || 
|-id=961 bgcolor=#E9E9E9
| 100961 ||  || — || August 17, 1998 || Socorro || LINEAR || — || align=right | 4.4 km || 
|-id=962 bgcolor=#fefefe
| 100962 ||  || — || August 17, 1998 || Socorro || LINEAR || — || align=right | 1.6 km || 
|-id=963 bgcolor=#E9E9E9
| 100963 ||  || — || August 17, 1998 || Socorro || LINEAR || — || align=right | 6.5 km || 
|-id=964 bgcolor=#E9E9E9
| 100964 ||  || — || August 17, 1998 || Socorro || LINEAR || ADE || align=right | 4.3 km || 
|-id=965 bgcolor=#fefefe
| 100965 ||  || — || August 17, 1998 || Socorro || LINEAR || V || align=right | 1.7 km || 
|-id=966 bgcolor=#fefefe
| 100966 ||  || — || August 17, 1998 || Socorro || LINEAR || — || align=right | 1.6 km || 
|-id=967 bgcolor=#fefefe
| 100967 ||  || — || August 17, 1998 || Socorro || LINEAR || — || align=right | 1.8 km || 
|-id=968 bgcolor=#fefefe
| 100968 ||  || — || August 17, 1998 || Socorro || LINEAR || — || align=right | 1.7 km || 
|-id=969 bgcolor=#fefefe
| 100969 ||  || — || August 17, 1998 || Socorro || LINEAR || NYS || align=right | 1.4 km || 
|-id=970 bgcolor=#E9E9E9
| 100970 ||  || — || August 17, 1998 || Socorro || LINEAR || — || align=right | 2.0 km || 
|-id=971 bgcolor=#E9E9E9
| 100971 ||  || — || August 17, 1998 || Socorro || LINEAR || — || align=right | 2.2 km || 
|-id=972 bgcolor=#fefefe
| 100972 ||  || — || August 17, 1998 || Socorro || LINEAR || NYS || align=right | 1.7 km || 
|-id=973 bgcolor=#E9E9E9
| 100973 ||  || — || August 17, 1998 || Socorro || LINEAR || — || align=right | 4.1 km || 
|-id=974 bgcolor=#E9E9E9
| 100974 ||  || — || August 17, 1998 || Socorro || LINEAR || — || align=right | 2.7 km || 
|-id=975 bgcolor=#fefefe
| 100975 ||  || — || August 17, 1998 || Socorro || LINEAR || NYS || align=right | 3.4 km || 
|-id=976 bgcolor=#E9E9E9
| 100976 ||  || — || August 17, 1998 || Socorro || LINEAR || — || align=right | 4.7 km || 
|-id=977 bgcolor=#fefefe
| 100977 ||  || — || August 25, 1998 || Bédoin || P. Antonini || — || align=right | 2.0 km || 
|-id=978 bgcolor=#fefefe
| 100978 ||  || — || August 24, 1998 || Socorro || LINEAR || H || align=right | 1.4 km || 
|-id=979 bgcolor=#fefefe
| 100979 ||  || — || August 24, 1998 || Socorro || LINEAR || PHO || align=right | 2.1 km || 
|-id=980 bgcolor=#fefefe
| 100980 ||  || — || August 24, 1998 || Socorro || LINEAR || H || align=right | 2.1 km || 
|-id=981 bgcolor=#fefefe
| 100981 ||  || — || August 20, 1998 || Kitt Peak || Spacewatch || NYS || align=right | 1.3 km || 
|-id=982 bgcolor=#fefefe
| 100982 ||  || — || August 22, 1998 || Xinglong || SCAP || — || align=right | 1.9 km || 
|-id=983 bgcolor=#fefefe
| 100983 ||  || — || August 23, 1998 || Xinglong || SCAP || V || align=right | 1.3 km || 
|-id=984 bgcolor=#E9E9E9
| 100984 ||  || — || August 17, 1998 || Socorro || LINEAR || — || align=right | 2.1 km || 
|-id=985 bgcolor=#d6d6d6
| 100985 ||  || — || August 17, 1998 || Socorro || LINEAR || — || align=right | 4.7 km || 
|-id=986 bgcolor=#fefefe
| 100986 ||  || — || August 17, 1998 || Socorro || LINEAR || NYS || align=right | 2.8 km || 
|-id=987 bgcolor=#E9E9E9
| 100987 ||  || — || August 17, 1998 || Socorro || LINEAR || — || align=right | 2.3 km || 
|-id=988 bgcolor=#E9E9E9
| 100988 ||  || — || August 17, 1998 || Socorro || LINEAR || — || align=right | 5.2 km || 
|-id=989 bgcolor=#fefefe
| 100989 ||  || — || August 17, 1998 || Socorro || LINEAR || NYS || align=right | 1.4 km || 
|-id=990 bgcolor=#fefefe
| 100990 ||  || — || August 17, 1998 || Socorro || LINEAR || V || align=right | 1.3 km || 
|-id=991 bgcolor=#fefefe
| 100991 ||  || — || August 17, 1998 || Socorro || LINEAR || — || align=right | 1.3 km || 
|-id=992 bgcolor=#fefefe
| 100992 ||  || — || August 17, 1998 || Socorro || LINEAR || FLO || align=right | 1.4 km || 
|-id=993 bgcolor=#E9E9E9
| 100993 ||  || — || August 17, 1998 || Socorro || LINEAR || — || align=right | 4.8 km || 
|-id=994 bgcolor=#fefefe
| 100994 ||  || — || August 17, 1998 || Socorro || LINEAR || — || align=right | 1.7 km || 
|-id=995 bgcolor=#fefefe
| 100995 ||  || — || August 17, 1998 || Socorro || LINEAR || — || align=right | 4.2 km || 
|-id=996 bgcolor=#E9E9E9
| 100996 ||  || — || August 17, 1998 || Socorro || LINEAR || — || align=right | 1.7 km || 
|-id=997 bgcolor=#fefefe
| 100997 ||  || — || August 17, 1998 || Socorro || LINEAR || FLO || align=right | 1.1 km || 
|-id=998 bgcolor=#fefefe
| 100998 ||  || — || August 17, 1998 || Socorro || LINEAR || — || align=right | 1.6 km || 
|-id=999 bgcolor=#fefefe
| 100999 ||  || — || August 17, 1998 || Socorro || LINEAR || — || align=right | 1.9 km || 
|-id=000 bgcolor=#fefefe
| 101000 ||  || — || August 17, 1998 || Socorro || LINEAR || NYS || align=right | 1.5 km || 
|}

References

External links 
 Discovery Circumstances: Numbered Minor Planets (100001)–(105000) (IAU Minor Planet Center)

0100